= Octave Uzanne =

French writer, publisher, and journalist (1851-1931)

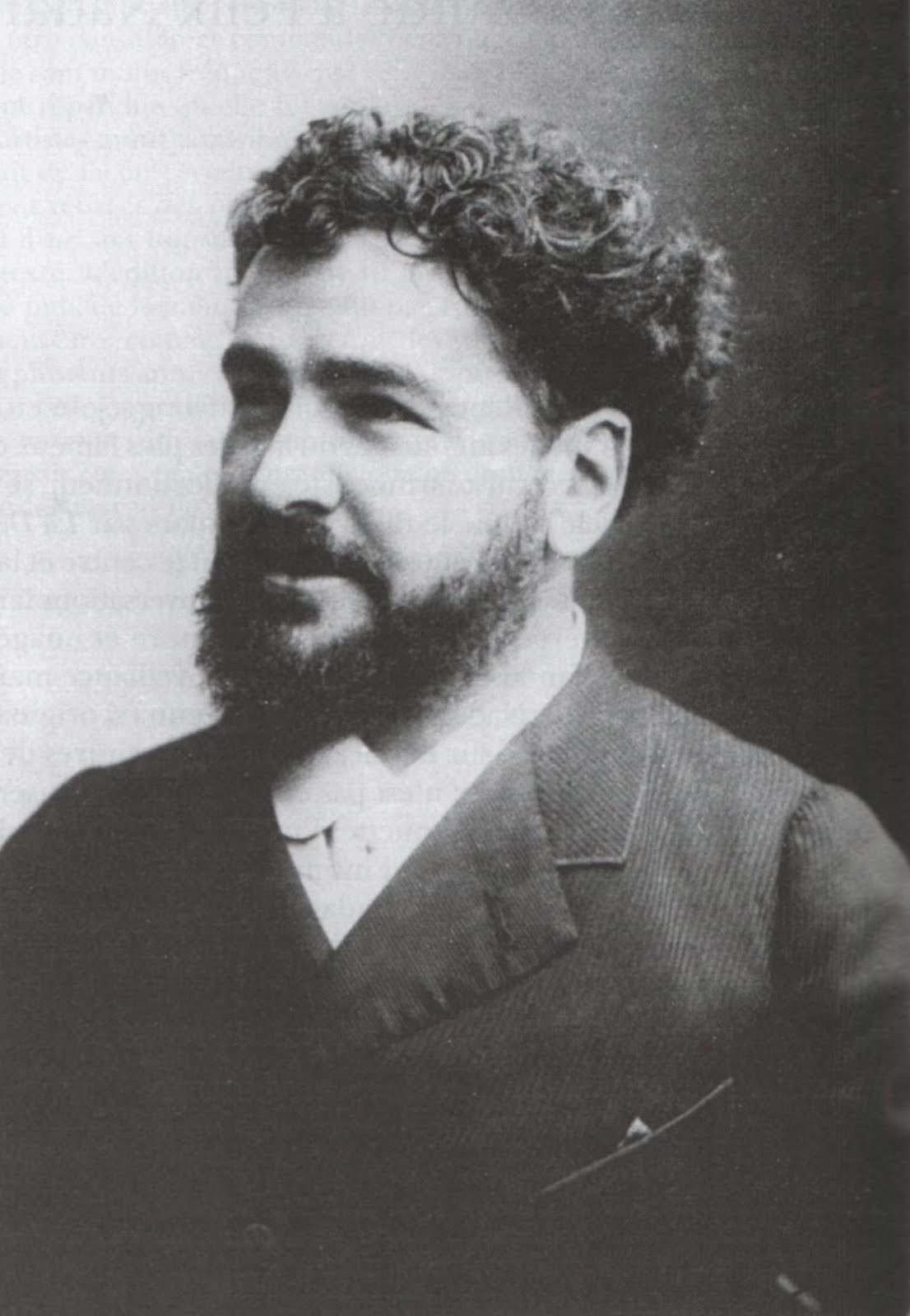
- Photography by Nadar (c. 1890)
- Born: Louis Octave Uzanne; 14 September 1851; Auxerre, France
- Died: 31 October 1931 (aged 80); Saint-Cloud, France
- Occupations: Writer, journalist, publisher
- Writing career
- Period: 19th century

Octave Uzanne (French pronunciation: [ɔktav yzan]; 14 September 1851 – 31 October 1931) was a 19th-century French bibliophile, writer, publisher, and journalist.

He is noted for his literary research on the authors of the 18th century. He published many previously unpublished works by authors including Paradis Moncrif, Benserade, Caylus, Besenval, the Marquis de Sade and Baudelaire. He founded the Société des Bibliophiles Contemporains, of which he was president. His research produced a considerable literary output and frequent publications in newspapers such as L'Echo, Le Plume, La Dépêche de Toulouse, Le Mercure de France, Le Gaulois and Le Figaro of Paris.

One of the topics his research focused on was the discussion of fashion and femininity in the French fin-de-siècle. This took the form of monographs and works including Son Altesse la femme (French for Her Highness Woman), Féminies and La Française du siècle (The Frenchwoman of the Century). His own works include novels and fantasy books, such as Surprises du Coeur and Contes pour les bibliophiles (Tales for bibliophiles).

== Biography ==
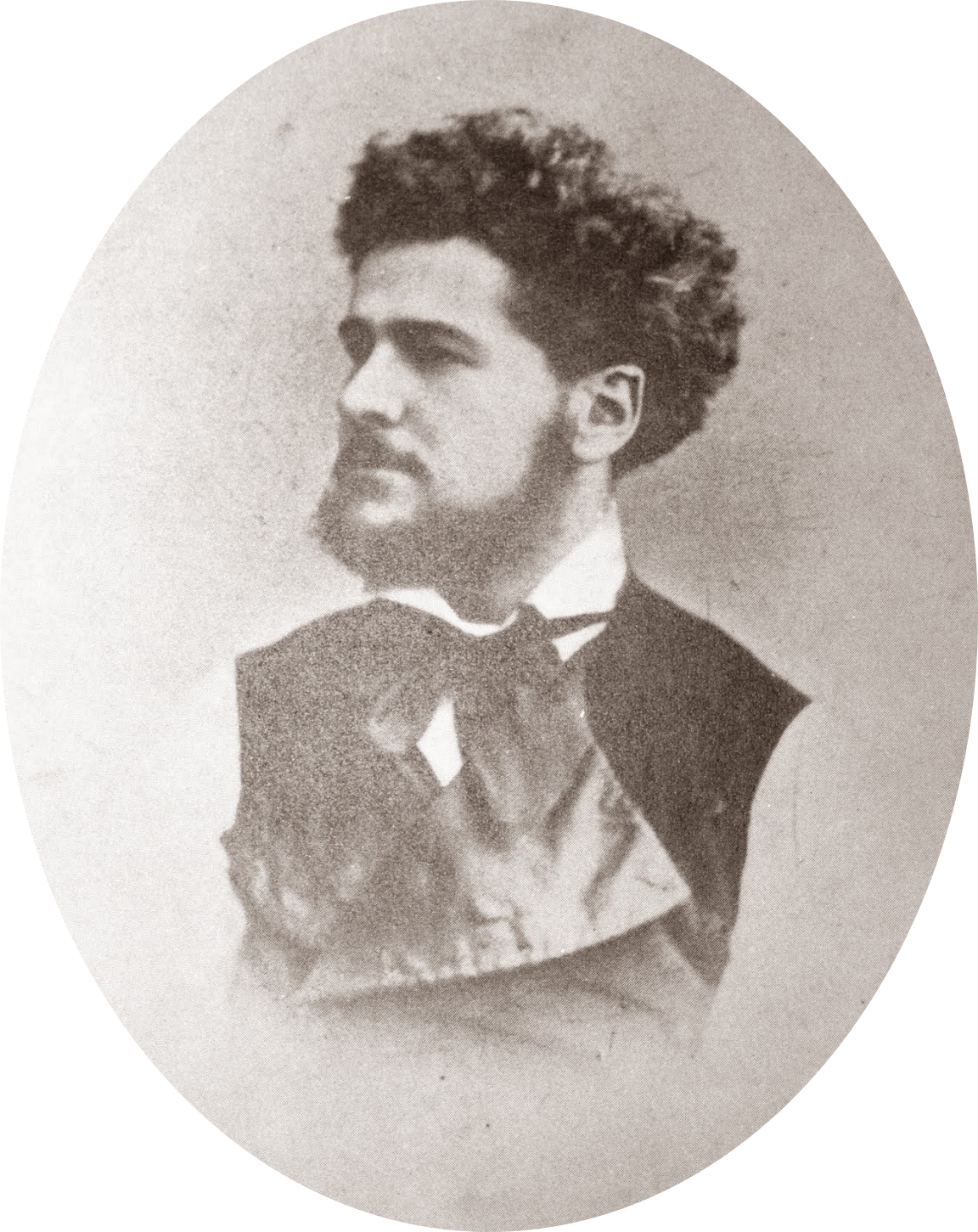
Uzanne in 1875, age 24.

=== Early life ===
Louis Octave Uzanne was born on 14 September 1851 in Auxerre, (Note: Birth certificate indicates he was born on 14 September 1851, and inscribed two days later at the civil registry of Auxerre: L'An mil-huit-cent-cinquante-un, le seize septembre à deux heures du soir ... est comparu Charles-Auguste Omer Uzanne ... lequel nous a déclaré que le quatorze de ce mois à six heures du soir est né en cette ville de lui et Laurence Octavie Chaulmet ... un enfant du sexe masculin qu'il a présenté et auquel il a donné les prénoms de Louis Octave. Other sources such as the American novelist Charles Dudley Warner, the Dictionnaire national des contemporains (1914), the obituary of the newspaper Le Temps and an article in the Bulletin de la société J.-K. Huysmans (1932), claim, without providing reference, born in 1852.) to a bourgeois family originating from Savoy. His parents were Charles-Auguste Omer Uzanne, a merchant, and Elisabeth Laurence Octavie; his elder brother Joseph, had been born the previous year. His classical studies began in his home town; he moved to Paris after his father's death to study at the Collège Rollin in Paris—a residential school for the children of the French upper-class. In Paris he became interested in the evolution and history of manuscripts and books. During the Franco-Prussian War of 1870–1871 he was attached to a school at Richmond in England. Continuing with law studies, he abandoned this line of work when he came into an inheritance in 1872, allowing him to pursue his literary interests.

He became a regular visitor of the Library of the Arsenal, where he joined a group of followers of the former librarian, Charles Nodier, along with the journalist Charles Monselet, writer Loredan Larchey, and author and bibliophile Paul Lacroix. He also joined the Société des Amis des Livres (founded in 1874), the first French bibliophilic association since the Société des Bibliophiles François (founded in 1820).

At the start of his career, Uzanne focused on the lesser-known writers of the 18th century, creating four volumes of work published by Jouast, and an additional 20+ volumes published by Albert Quantin. He was an admirer of the Goncourt brothers, who were also writers on the subject of 18th-century France. Uzanne looked for mentors who were bibliophiles like him, rather than literary scholars (érudits) like his companions at the Arsenal. (Note: Silverman described the brothers like "a curious blend of modernism and reaction". Apter mentions that "like the Goncourt brothers Uzanne codified the tropes of feminine sensibility already in place within the courtly tradition of French letters or within a popular journalism of the 1830s", and she cites the Girardin's book Chroniques parisiennes.) While focusing on past subjects, he was very up-to-date on the technical aspects of printing and publishing. His 1879 work Le bric-à-brac de l'amour (literally, A bric-a-brac of love) was one of the first to employ the gillotage, a zincography technique, and photo-mechanical reproduction. Jackson points out that Uzanne, in Les Zigzags d'un curieux (literally, Zigzags of a Curious Man), divided the book collectors in two groups: those who are interested in the book as if it were a kind of stock market share (valeur de Bourse), a market quotation whose fluctuations "they follow with a gamester's interest", and those—whom he considers "pures"—attracted to the book itself, its contents, rarity or beauty.

=== Bibliophile and journalist ===
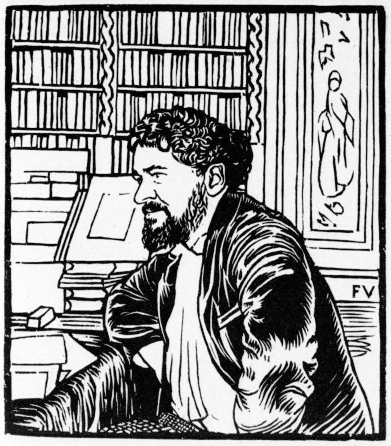
Portrait of Uzanne by Félix Vallotton (1892)

Contes pour les bibliophiles (1895), written with Albert Robida

After leaving the Société des Amis des Livres, which he found too conservative and too concerned with the reissue of old works, he started two new bibliographic societies, the Société des Bibliophiles Contemporaines (1889–1894) and the Societé des Bibliophiles Indépendants (1896–1901). The first consisted of 160 people, including the writers Jules Claretie and Jean Richepin, the artists Albert Robida and Paul Avril, and the journalist and critic Francisque Sarcey. Uzanne also edited two magazines, Conseiller du bibliophile (literally, Adviser of bibliophile, 1876–1877) and Les miscellanées bibliographiques (The Bibliographical Miscellany, 1878–1880), and then ran three consecutive bibliophilic magazines: Le livre : bibliographie moderne (literally, The Book: Modern Bibliography, 1880–1889), Le livre moderne : revue du monde littéraire et des bibliophiles contemporaines (literally, The Modern Book: Journal of the Literary World and Contemporary Bibliophiles, 1890–1891), and L'Art et l'Idée : revue contemporaine du dilettantisme l'littéraire et de la curiosité (Art and Ideas: Contemporary Journal of the Literary Dilettantism and Curiosity, 1892–1893). In the early 1890s, he was considered to be "... the best authority that book lovers know on subjects specially interesting to book lovers". Nevertheless, such books as Le Miroir du Monde (The Mirror of the World) or L'ombrelle – le gant – le manchon (The Sunshade, Muff, and Glove) received negative reviews from some newspapers for Avril's illustrations.

In contrast to most bibliophiles of his time, Uzanne was chiefly interested in the creation of new, luxurious bibliophile works, collaborating closely with printers, binders, typographers and artists (especially the Symbolists and early Art Nouveau artists). (Note: In Caprice d'un Bibliophile (1878) Uzanne firmly defended the use of symbolism in the book collector.) Among them were such painters as James McNeill Whistler, Adolphe Lalauze and Jules Barbey d'Aurevilly—who wrote the preface of Le bric-à-brac de l'amour (1879)—, (Note: Uzanne considered Barbey his master (maître) in dandyism and iconoclasm.) the writer Jean Lorrain, and jewellery artists and exponents of Japonisme such as Henri Vever. One of the main artists collaborating with Uzanne was the Belgian Félicien Rops, who illustrated some of his books and created the cover illustration for Le Livre Moderne, and who called Uzanne "the Bibliophile's dream". The overall quality of Uzanne's books was remarked upon by The New York Times when reviewing his 1894 work La Femme à Paris: "The book is a highly-artistic achievement in a typographical sense ... This artistic element and the style of the author ... elevate the work from its sphere of usefulness into the sphere of pure literature. It will be serviceable a century from now to students of our civilization." Other symbolic works of art were Féminies (1896), in which Rops illustrated many scenes of worldly life, or Son Altesse la femme (Her Highness Woman, 1885), on which he drew a naked witch in the chapter on medieval women. In the work he explored the lives of women at all levels of French society of his time. But also, according to Silverman, Uzanne associate feminism with a dangerous debauchery of sexual and moral investment, making full use a series of medical and philosophical sources, with the intention of proving the inability of women to merge into public life and the labour market, because of their temperament. Uzanne further indicated that the female figure and ornaments were essential in the French decorative arts, something that was missing in the early 20th century.

Uzanne's bibliophile activity in the early 1880s coincided with the gradual abandonment of manual methods of printing illustrations kin favour of photomechanized methods. His collection of contemporary bibliophilic books was sold in 1894 by Hôtel Drouot. It contained some of the finest examples of late 19th-century French bookbinding, by binders like Charles Meunier, Lucien Magnin, Pétrus Ruban, Camille Martin, René Wiener and Victor Prouvé.

Uzanne was also well known in the literary circles of his day, as attested by this poem of Stéphane Mallarmé in Vers de circonstance (1920):

Non comme pour étinceler
Aux immortels dos de basane
Tard avec mon laisser-aller
je vous salue, Octave Uzanne

(Not as if to sparkle with mirth
at the immortal sheepskin spines
late with my usual sloppiness

I greet you, Octave Uzanne)

— Stéphane Mallarmé (Zwerling Sugano 1992, p. 246)

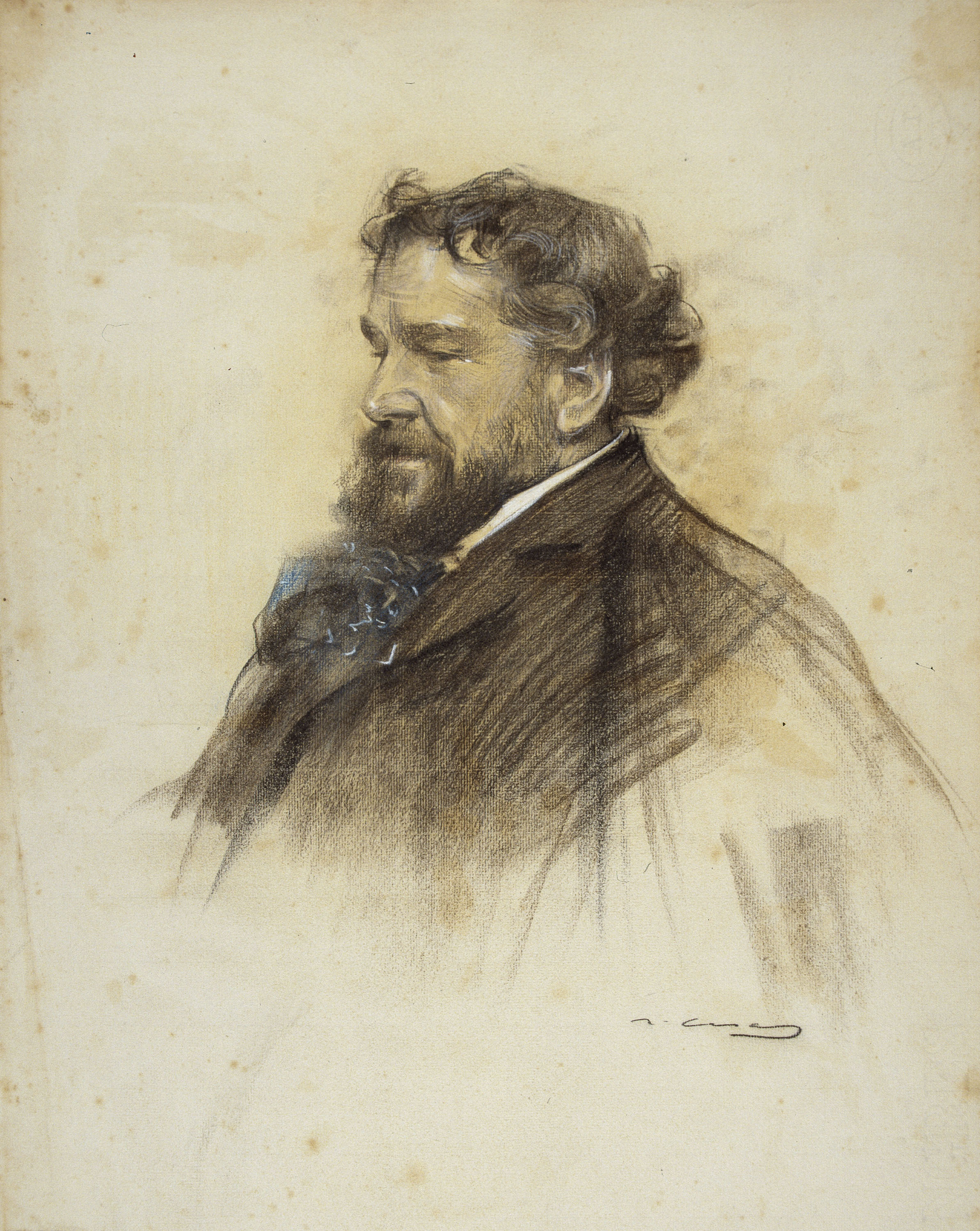
Portrait (1906) by Ramon Casas i Carbó from the Spanish magazine Forma

As a journalist, sometimes employing the pseudonym "la Cagoule", Uzanne wrote for L'Écho de Paris, Le Gaulois and other newspapers. In addition, for other French and foreign magazines like The Studio, (Note: In his review in The Studio, British magazine specializing in decorative arts, Uzanne remarks: "[only] decorative style ... can give full, trustworthy and constant testimony to an epoch, a race, and a country; that is the reason why we attach so much importance to it".) Magazine of Art, and Scribner's Magazine, for which he wrote in 1894 an article, "The End of Books", which he thought would come because of the rise of phonography, where he predicted the rise of radio and television. Uzanne was fascinated by modern technology and the possibilities it offered for the reproduction and dissemination of words, sounds, and images, which was evidenced not only in that article or in his groundbreaking work in book publishing, but also in an article he wrote in 1893 for the French newspaper Le Figaro, about a visit he made to US President Grover Cleveland and the inventor Thomas Edison during the EXPO Chicago 1893, where he witnessed the Kinetograph shortly before it went public.

Books and women, these were the first of Uzanne's loves, and I do not think he has disowned them, because the library is always full of invaluable and rare books, and the first book that he wanted to retouch and republish for the general public, is precisely a monograph of the Parisienne. (Note: Uzanne did not consider women to be bibliophiles like him: "... I do not think there deep and intimate sympathy between women and books.") ... One thinks Sébastien Mercier and Restif de la Bretonne, and no wrong. It is between these two great observers of French mores and the human heart has its place naturally Octave Uzanne.

— de Gourmont 1927, pp. 130, 135

In general, Silverman assigned to him "anti-Semitic tendencies" and the Bibliothèque nationale de France is credited with the authorship of the anti-Semitic pamphlet Israël chez John Bull : l'Angleterre juive (1913), under the pseudonym "Théo-Doedalus". The journalist Gustave Geffroy, in the prologue of Pietro Longhi (1924) by Uzanne, also listed this work among other works of Uzanne. On this pamphlet, he criticized the British government, including figures as Benjamin Disraeli and Nathan Mayer Rothschild. Uzanne collaborated with Edouard Drumont on his antisemitic newspaper La Libre Parole. Drumont and Uzanne held a cordial friendship through mail, and Uzanne helped him in the publication of the essay La France juive (Jewish France, 1886).

As an art critic, Uzanne wrote several reviews of etchings, as in a critique of French painter and illustrator Félix Buhot: "Buhot is a visionary, one obsessed by the picturesqueness of modern life; nervous to excess, tortured by a crowd of fleeting impressions and queer ideas, he suffered from a cruel inability to reproduce them as he wished." Uzanne's written style was characterized by the use of Anglicisms and eccentric neologisms.

=== Fashion writer ===
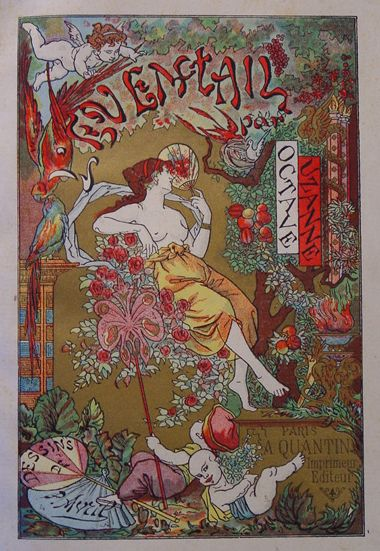
Cover of L'éventail (1882) with art by Paul Avril

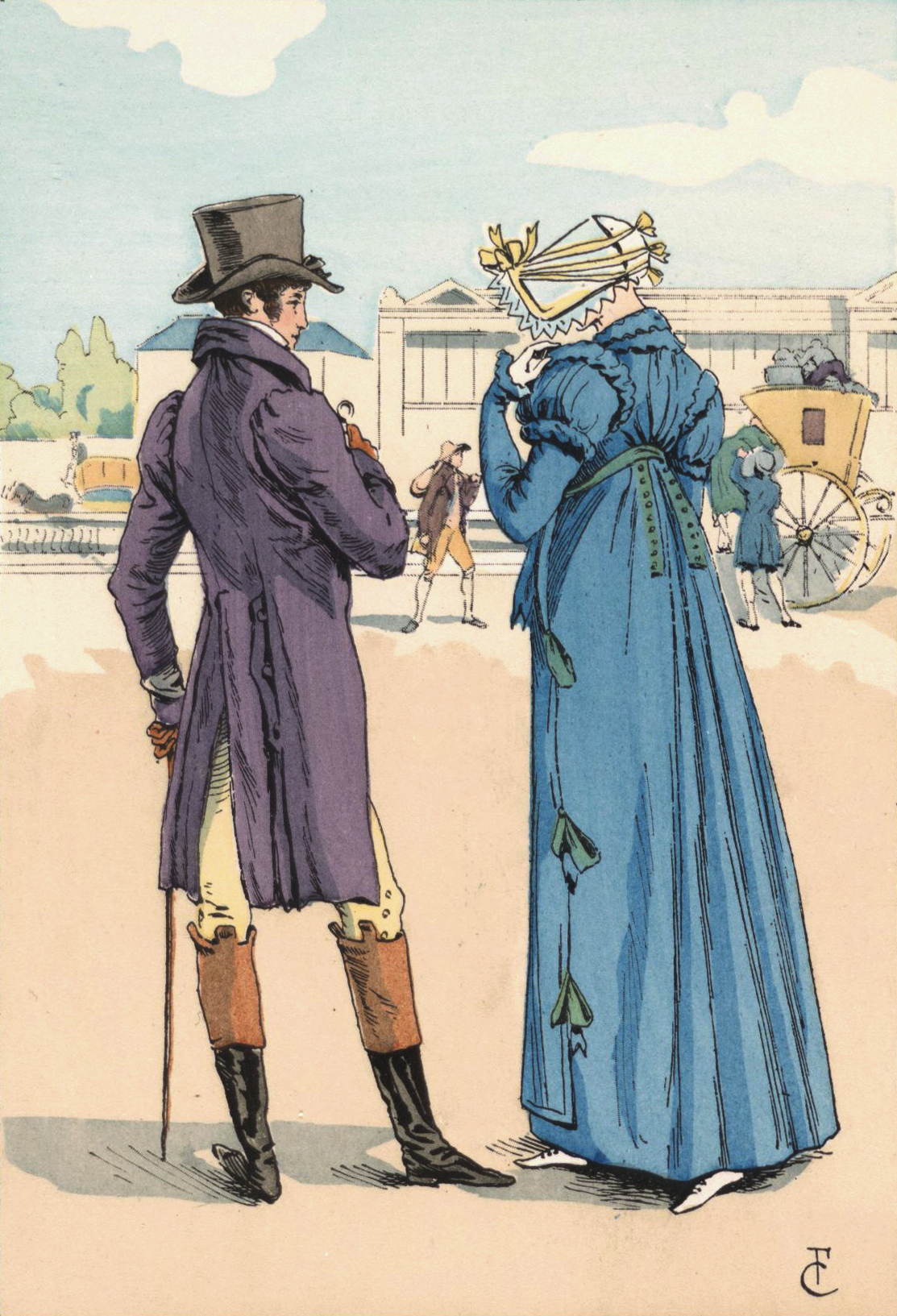
"Waiting for the Saint-Cloud Coach, Place de la Concorde" in Les Modes de Paris (1898, published in London as Fashion in Paris) by Uzanne and illustrated by François Courboin. The book contains more than one hundred full-page illustrations of walks in the Bois de Boulogne and annual exhibitions of paintings in the Louvre

Another of Uzanne's interests was female fashion, about which he wrote a number of books and articles that were later translated into English. Specifically, he was focused on the image of the Parisienne, the women of Paris. Uzanne is perceived by some to have had a desire to revive French national pride; he shared the nationalistic feelings of other members of the generation who had experienced the defeat by Prussia in 1870. This was reflected in their efforts to promote a renewal of the decorative arts. Silverman mentions that Uzanne believed that married bourgeois women should not only decorate the walls of their homes, but also "cultivate luxury and art in an ornament ignored by their aristocratic predecessors: their undergarments". (Note: Some historians have suggested that the philanthropy of the 19th century was the precursor of consumption, at this time the woman would have projected from the domestic sphere to the modern world through philanthropic activities and related consumption. Uzanne himself noted in La Femme à Paris that shopping at department stores was one of the few social activities of bourgeois woman of the time, apart from acts of charity and family life.) Uzanne felt that the eroticism of the theatrical atmosphere was no longer what it had been and had become "more moral, more bourgeois". His first and perhaps most famous book on fashion was L'Éventail (1882, translated as The Fan in 1884), a "delightful" illustrated story about the hand fans. He admitted that his book "in no way a work of powerful wisdom and erudition", but simply the first in a projected series of "little books for the boudoir".

"Among the jewels of female ornamentation, the fan is the priority because, in the land of grace and spirit, still shines in the front row."

— Hiner 2011, p. 145 (cf. Octave Uzanne, L'Éventail, 1882, p. 6)

His second book about fashion, L'ombrelle – le gant – le manchon (1883, translated in the same year as The Sunshade, Muff, and Glove), was also illustrated in rococo style by Paul Avril; in one of its lines Uzanne emphasized a female clothing accessory: "The muff!", he said, "Its name alone has something adorable, downy, and voluptuous about it." Later he published Les ornements de la femme (1892), that reproduced in one volume the combined texts of L'Éventail and L'ombrelle – le gant – le manchon. His 1898 work Monument esthématique du XIX^{e} siècle : Les Modes de Paris, translated as Fashions in Paris, was according to the review in The New York Times "... the most complete and exhaustive work on the subject of French fashions that has yet appeared". However, in this book he wanted to re-establish the intimate and feminine culture of the rococo—but during his life he became influenced by modernism— and also he criticized the "sartorial severity" of the femme nouvelle.

An example of the historical novel is La Française du siècle (1886, published in English as The Frenchwoman of the Century in 1887), where Uzanne suggests that the effect of the Revolution on the woman of the period was "lamentable and disastrous": "All French spirit, grace, and finesse seemed to have been submerged in the bloody deliriums of the crowd." In a couple of chapters of the book he described the France of the late Eighteenth Century, during the French Revolution; some of its pages exhibited the "frivolity of women" during those years. For example, in a chapter on one of the stages of the French Revolution—known as the Directory— (Note: For Uzanne the Nineteenth Century was born on the morrow of the 9th Thermidor Year II (27 July 1794).) he included descriptions of customs such as the bals des victimes: to these dancing assemblies, held at the Hôtel Richelieu, only admitted "aristocrats who could boast a relative guillotined during the Terror"; he wrote that women cut their hair, as if they would be guillotined—some even carried a red ribbon around their neck. Uzanne disclosed that the five Directors who had established themselves at the Luxembourg formed a kind of Court-society, and gave frequent entertainments: the queens of this society were de Staël, Hamelin, Bonaparte and Tallien.

Some moralists have pretended that the costumes of women have almost always undergone the same variations as their virtue. This is possible, and the study might be made in an amusing parallel; but carry, if you will, before the tribunal of fashion the cause of the merveilleiises of the Directory, the sincere friends of art will still recognise that amongst these pagan women pleasure obtained a brilliant victory over decency, and that their extreme grace made their absence of dignity forgotten.

— The Eclectic Magazine 1888, p. 100 (cf. Octave Uzanne, The Frenchwoman of the Century, 1886, p. 42)

Although he focuses on the French Revolution, the story ends in the 1880s, shortly after the Second French Empire, closely following the evolution of society and women (see also Historiography of the French Revolution). Later, he republished what was essentially is the same book but with a different title, in both French and English: La Femme et la mode. Métamorphoses de la parisienne de 1792 à 1892 or Woman and Fashion: Metamorphoses of the Parisienne 1792–1892 in the English version (1892), and Les Modes de Paris. Variations du goût et de l'esthétique de la femme, 1797–1897 (1897). According to the Westminster Review, the English edition was practically a facsimile of the French, and the translator literally wrote the sentences to the point of unintelligibility.

Seductive spirit, all in lace and fripperies, M. Uzanne has touched the Belles Lettres, darling the History, irritated the Psychology and flirted with the Criticism. He has made more intimate the erudition, to literature and powdered makeup the most gallant of the world. He has told us l'Éventail, l'Ombrelle, the most charming artifices of feminine beauty, the pleasant platitudes I appreciate all the charm, though they may be an insufficient approach to strict style studies.

— Albalat 1905, p. 211

=== Later life and death ===
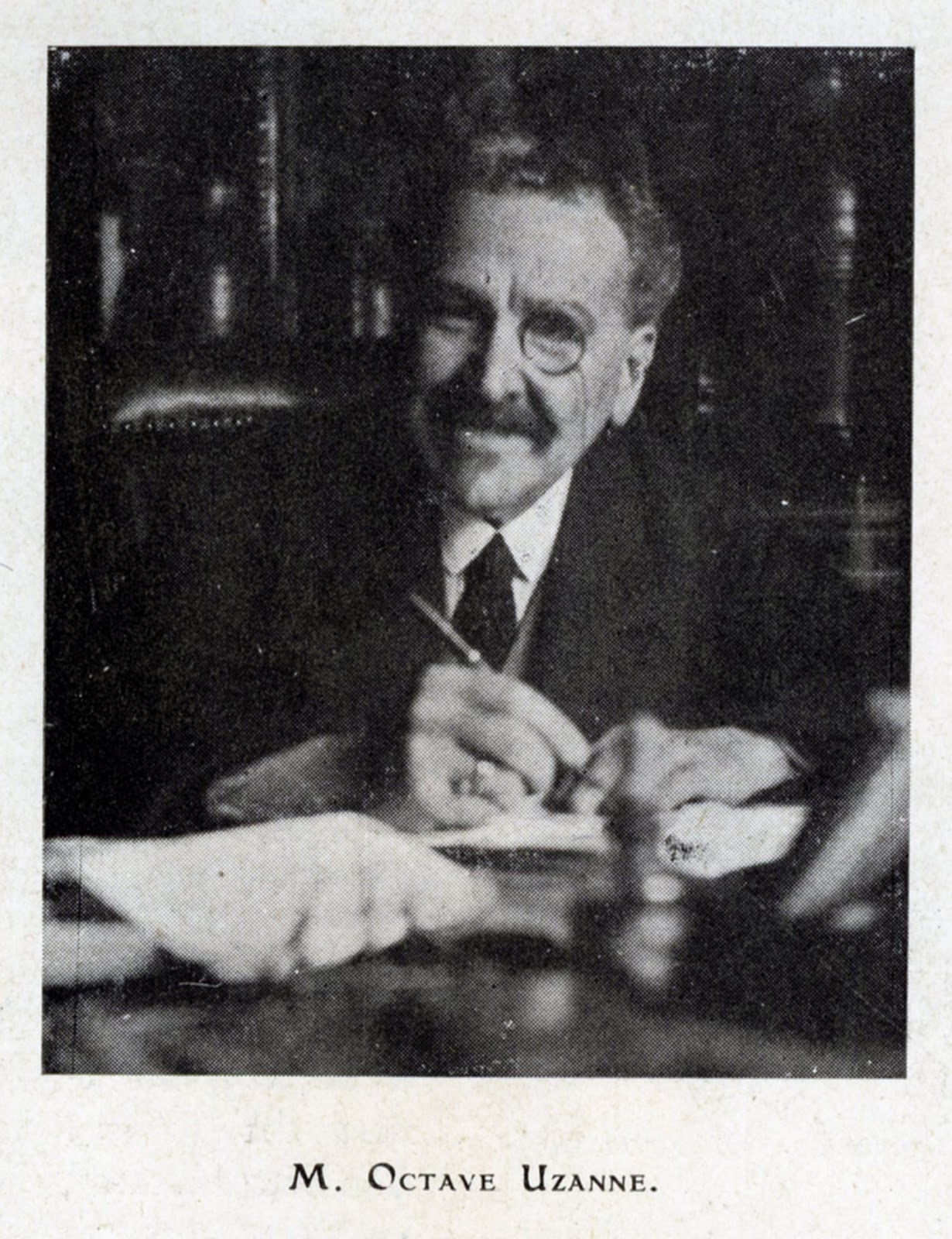
Uzanne in 1928, age 77. Published in the journal L'Imprimerie et la pensée moderne (1928).

Uzanne never married, and in later life he wrote in praise of celibacy; however, according to Remy de Gourmont, in writing about women Uzanne would not have been one of those authors who "exalted ambrosia without having tasted it". Uzanne's feelings toward women, as well as those of Jules Barbey d'Aurevilly, were ambivalent in nature, a mixture of attraction and indifference. He also explored the concept of woman artists, subscribing to the view that women lack creative ability, a quality he associated solely with men: "The curious and paradoxical physiologist [Cesare Lombroso?] has argued that the woman genius does not exist, and when such genius manifests itself it is a hoax of nature; in this sense, she is male." Based on that, Uzanne said that women artists perpetrated mediocre studies and exhibitions of painting and sculpture, and used this argument to support the idea that gender difference is the foundation of creativity.

Silverman mentions that he became in an "archetypal figure of the Belle Époque", a "handsome monsieur with a beard" (joli monsieur avec une barbe) admired by Félicien Rops, and an "elegant storyteller" (l'élégant conteur) according to Anatole France. Silverman notes a contrast between the snobbish, dandy and reactionary side of Uzanne with a penchant for forgotten authors of the 17th and 18th centuries, and he, in turn, was an innovative artist and bibliophile, the antithesis of the antique collectors of the "old guard", formed by bibliophiles—mostly aristocrats—who organised the Société des Bibliophiles François. Uzanne spent his last years in his apartment in Saint-Cloud, where he died on 21 October 1931. His remains were cremated at the crematorium and cemetery Père Lachaise.

Monsieur, you have the feeling of women [le sentiment de la femme]. You have what no one else has in our cold era: a loving imagination.

— Preface of Barbey d'Aurevilly in Le bric-à-brac de l'amour by Uzanne, 1879, p. X

== Selected bibliography of works by Uzanne ==
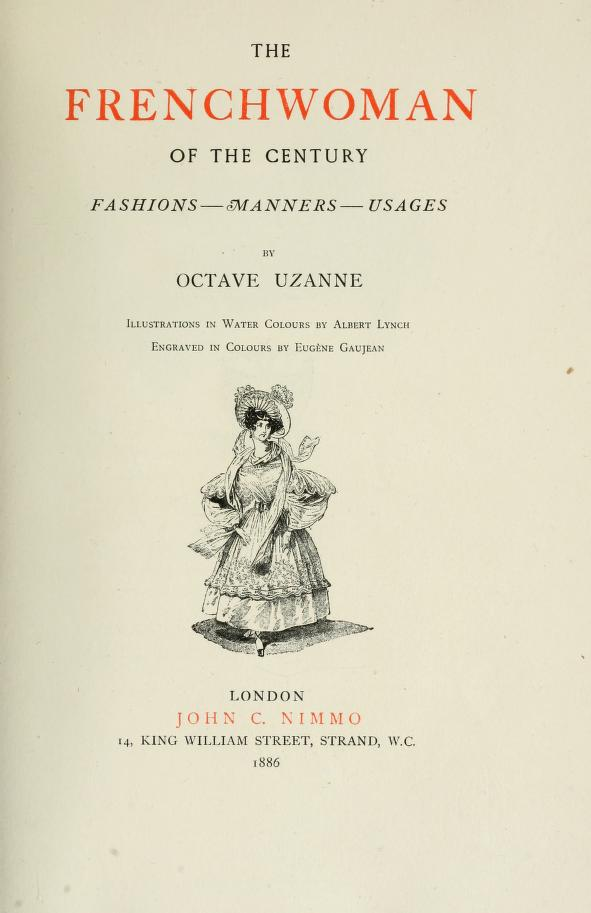
Title page of The Frenchwoman of the Century

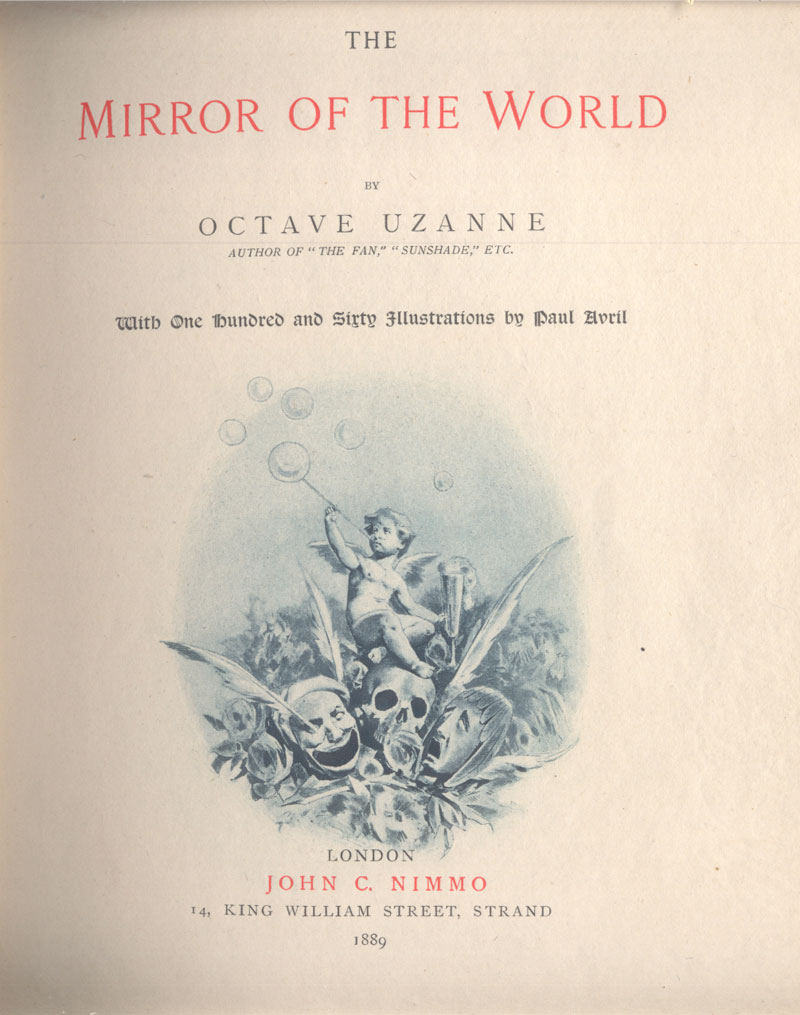
Title page of The Mirror of the World

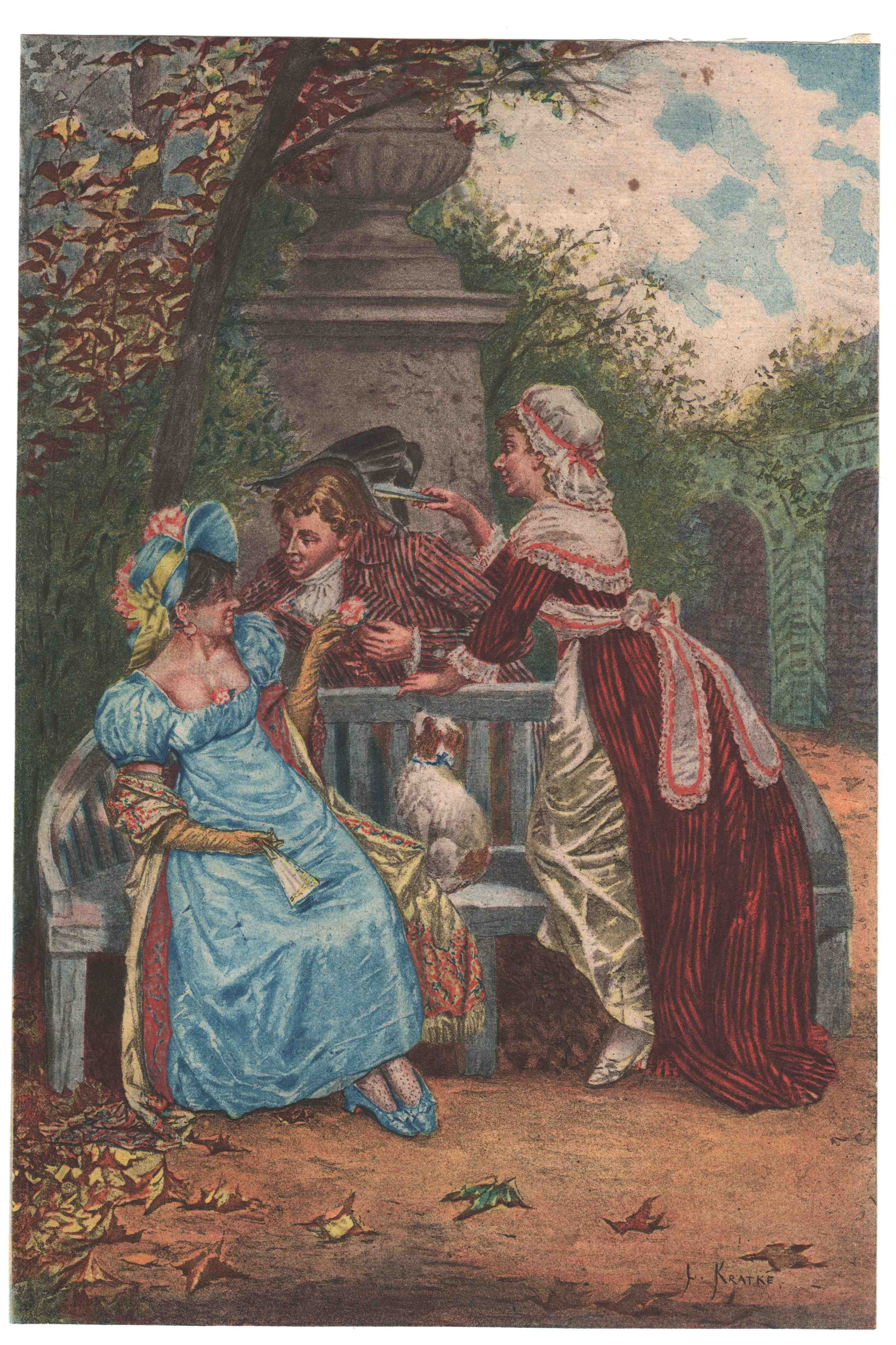
Illustration of Son altesse la femme

- 1875–1878: Poètes de ruelles au XVII^{e} siècle, 4 volumes edited by Uzanne, printed by Damase Jouast: followed by Les Petits Conteurs du XVIII^{e} siècle, 12 volumes edited by Uzanne, and Documents sur les Mœurs du XVIII^{e} siècle, 4 volumes edited by Uzanne
- 1878: Les Caprices d'un bibliophile, published by Édouard Rouveyre
- 1879: Le bric-à-brac de l'amour, illustrated by Adolphe Lalauze, with a foreword by Barbey d'Aurevilly, published by Édouard Rouveyre
- 1880: Le Calendrier de Vénus
- 1881: Les Surprises du cœur, illustrated by Paul Avril, published by Édouard Rouveyre
- 1882: L'éventail: illustrated by Paul Avril, published by Quantin; published in English as The Fan by John C. Nimmo in 1884
- 1883: L'Ombrelle – Le Gant – Le Manchon, illustrated by Paul Avril, published by Quantin; published in English as The sunshade, muff, and glove by John C. Nimmo in London in 1883
- 1885: Son Altesse la Femme (literally Her Highness Woman), published in Paris; no English edition
- 1886: La Française du siècle : modes, mœurs, usages, illustrated by Albert Lynch, published by Quantin, republished in 1893: published in English as The Frenchwoman of the Century, John C. Nimmo, London; also published by Routledge in 1887
- 1886: Nos amis les livres. Causeries sur la littérature curieuse et la librairie, published by Quantin
- 1887: La Reliure moderne artistique et fantaisiste
- 1888: Les Zigzags d'un curieux. Causeries sur l'art des livres et la littérature d'art, published by Quantin
- 1888: Le Miroir du Monde : notes et sensations de la vie pittoresque, illustrated by Paul Avril, published by Quantin; published as The Mirror of the World by John C. Nimmo in 1889
- 1890: Le Paroissien du Célibataire
- 1892: la Femme et la mode
- 1892: Les Ornements de la femme: combined edition of L'éventail and L'ombrelle – le gant – le manchon, published in Paris by Quantin
- 1893: Vingt Jours dans le Nouveau Monde, published by May et Motteroz
- 1893: Bouquinistes et bouquineurs : physiologie des quais de Paris, du Pont-Royal au Pont Sully, published by may et Motteroz; translated as The Bookhunter in Paris, Elliot Stock, 1895
- 1894: La Femme à Paris – nos contemporaines, illustrated by Pierre Vidal, cover art by Léon Rudnicki, published by Quantin; published in English in 1894 by Heinemann
- 1895: Contes pour les bibliophiles, co-authored with Albert Robida, typography by George Auriol; translated as Tales for bibliophiles, Chicago, The Caxton Club, 1929
- 1896: Badauderies parisiennes. Les rassemblements. Physiologies de la rue, illustrated by Félix Vallotton, preface by Uzanne, published by Uzanne
- 1896: Dictionnaire bibliosophique, typologique, iconophilesque, bibliopégique et bibliotechnique a l'usage des bibliognostes, des bibliomanes et des bibliophlistins, published by Uzanne
- 1896: Contes de la Vingtième Année. Anthology of Bric à Brac de l'Amour, Calendrier de Vénus, and Surprises du Cæur, published by Floury.
- 1897: La Nouvelle Bibliopolis : voyage d'un novateur au pays des néo-icono-bibliomanes, illustrated by Félicien Rops, published by Floury
- 1898: L'Art dans la décoration extérieure des livres en France et à l'etranger. Les couvertures illustrées, les cartonnages d'éditeurs, la reliure d'art, binding by Louis Guingot
- 1898: Monument esthématique du XIX^{e} siècle : Les Modes de Paris, variations du goût et de l'esthétique de la femme, 1797–1897, illustrated by François Courboin, published by L.-H. May; translated into English as Fashion in Paris by Lady Mary Lloyd, published by Heinemann, London in 1898; republished in 1901 in a cheaper edition
- 1900: L'Art et les artifices de beauté (5th edition in 1902)
- 1904: The French Bookbinders of the eighteenth century, Chicago, Caxton Club, translated by Mabel McIlvaine.
- 1908: Drawings by Watteau, London, George Newnes
- 1910: Études de sociologie féminine : Parisiennes de ce temps et leurs divers milieux, états et conditions, published by Mercure de France; published in English in 1912 as The Modern Parisienne by Heinemann, London and by G. P. Putnam's Sons, New York; published in German as Die Pariserin. Studien zur Geschichte der Frau der Gesellschaft der Französischen Galanterie und der Zeitgenössischen Sitten in 1929 by Paul Aretz, Dresden.
- 1911: Sottisier des mœurs, published by Émile-Paul
- 1912: La Locomotion à travers le temps, les mœurs et l'espace
- 1914: Instantanés d'Angleterre, published by Payot

Theatre and nightlife of France were also covered in his criticisms: shortly before the First World War, he wrote that "the public is accustomed to the irregular life of an actress ... and each spectator gives himself the pleasure of imagining a possible liaison with one of these queens of the footlights." Uzanne's literary output in the early twentieth century declined to minor journal articles and inexpensive editions in cheap-format books; for example, his 1902 book L'art et les artifices de la beauté only contained illustrations in black and white. Uzanne also contributed notes, forewords or commentary to a number of other books, as an appendix in The two young brides (1902, English translation of Mémoires de deux jeunes mariées), whose theme was portraits:

[When Balzac died] Never was there a face more noble, more superbly youthful, more mighty in its repose, than this, the image of which is Eugene Giraud's legacy to us.

— Octave Uzanne, The two young brides, 1902, p. 367
