= Antisemitism in the French Third Republic =

Antisemitism in the French Third Republic was characterized by the Dreyfus Affair, the Boulangist crisis, and the creation of leagues among the far-right as nationalism became a core right-wing value.

== Introduction ==
It began with the Dreyfus Affair, which had begun to subside by the turn of the twentieth century, at which point nationalist group Action française began to gain popularity. Antisemitism, which had previously been common on both sides of the political spectrum, became an ideology of the right — even, particularly after the Sacred Union of the First World War, of the far right. The 1930s saw a resurgence in antisemitism, as "Judeo-Bolshevism" became a subject of public denunciation in the aftermath of the October Revolution.

== Antisemitism from 1870 to 1914 ==
=== Publications ===
French antisemitism at the end of the 19th century was characterized by the quantity and virulence of antisemitic publications, especially Édouard Drumont's book La France juive ('Jewish France') and his newspaper La Libre Parole.

=== Riots ===
During this period, particularly at the height of the Dreyfus Affair, riots took place in a number of French cities (most notably in Paris, Marseille, Lyon, Nancy, Bordeaux, Perpignan, and Angers), in which thousands of people attacked Jewish-owned businesses. In Paris, organized bands incited riots in Jewish neighborhoods such as the Marais and Belleville. These riots took place primarily between 1892 and 1894.

== Popular Front ==
Léon Blum of the Popular Front coalition suffered the most notable antisemitic attack in France on 13 February 1936. Shortly before becoming prime minister, Blum was dragged from a car and almost beaten to death by the Camelots du Roi, a group of antisemites and royalists. The group's parent organisation, the right-wing Action Française, was dissolved by the government following this incident, not long before the elections that brought Blum to power. Blum became the first socialist and the first Jew to serve as Prime Minister of France. As such he was an object of particular hatred from antisemitic elements.
