= Isidore Singer =

American editor and activist (1859–1939)

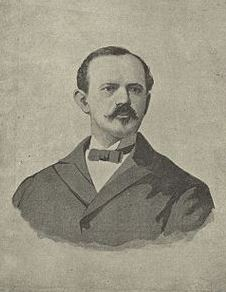
- Born: 10 November 1859; Weisskirchen, Moravia, Austrian Empire
- Died: 20 February 1939 (aged 79); New York City, New York, United States
- Spouse: Virginie Charrat (m. 1888; died 1930)

Academic background
- Education: University of Vienna

Academic work
- Notable works: The Jewish Encyclopedia

Isidore Singer (German: Isidor Singer, Yiddish: ישראל זינגער; 10 November 1859 – 20 February 1939) was an Austrian-born American encyclopedist, editor, and activist. He is best known as the managing editor of The Jewish Encyclopedia.

== Biography ==
Isidore Singer was born to Charlotte (née Eisler) and Joseph Singer in 1859 in Weisskirchen, Moravia, in the Austrian Empire (now Hranice, Czech Republic). He was raised in an observant Jewish household with seven children, where Yiddish was the primary language. At the time of Singer's birth, the Jewish community in Weisskirchen comprised approximately 800 individuals, making up about 13% of the town's total population. He attended the gymnasia of Ungarisch-Hradisch, Kremsier, and Troppau.

Singer was later educated at the Universities of Berlin and Vienna, receiving his Ph.D. from the latter in 1884. Alongside his university studies, Singer pursued Jewish religious and textual studies at the Hochschule für die Wissenschaft des Judentums in Berlin and the Rabbinical Seminary in Vienna, where he came under the influence of Adolf Jellinek. During this period, Singer also met Theodor Herzl, who was at the time studying law at the University of Vienna.

In 1884, Singer established the Allgemeine Österreichische Literaturzeitung, which he edited and published in Vienna. Singer discontinued the publication after being appointed secretary and librarian to Count Alexandre Foucher de Careil, the French ambassador to Vienna, in 1887.

=== France ===
After relocating to Paris with Count Foucher de Careil, Singer joined the French Foreign Office's press bureau. While in France, he was active in the campaign on behalf of Alfred Dreyfus. In 1893–1894, Singer founded and served as editor-in-chief of La Vraie Parole, a biweekly journal created to counter the antisemitic narratives promoted by Édouard Drumont's La Libre Parole.

=== New York ===
Singer moved to New York City in 1895 where he aimed to publish a comprehensive "Encyclopedia of the History and Mental Evolution of the Jewish Race". Despite facing numerous challenges in securing support, he eventually succeeded in launching the project. The Jewish Encyclopedia was published in 12 volumes between 1901 and 1909 by Funk & Wagnalls, with Singer serving as managing editor.

Singer later served as managing editor of the 7-volume International Insurance Encyclopedia (1910) and co-editor of the 20-volume German Classics of the 19th and 20th Centuries.

Over the course of his career, Singer proposed a large number of projects which never won backing. These included an Encyclopedia of the Holy Land, a Young People's Encyclopedia of Jewish Knowledge, an Encyclopedia of Prayers, and a 25-volume series of Hebrew classics. He corresponded with W. E. B. Du Bois about creating an encyclopedia of the African diaspora. Singer also proposed creating a unified Jewish university in the United States by merging existing seminaries.

== Religious views ==
Singer became disillusioned in his later years with what he saw as insufficient support for scholars within the American Jewish community. His "confrontational personality and wild ideas", including his vision for the future of Judaism, often put him at odds with American Jewish leadership.

Singer called for discarding traditional Jewish ceremonial practices and envisioned a liberal, universalist Judaism. Singer believed this approach could form the basis for a global religion rooted in humanism and scientific scholarship, fostering international peace. To advance these ideas, he founded the Amos Society in 1922, an interfaith, monotheistic organization aimed at promoting global understanding. Through messages sent under the banner of the Society, Singer promoted the idea that Jews and Protestant Christians—who both faced rising religious indifference and materialism as common threats—should focus on their core similarities rather than theological divisions, and embrace the ethical teachings of the Prophets as a shared foundation.

== Selected publications ==
- Berlin, Wien und der Antisemitismus [Berlin, Vienna and Antisemitism] (in German). Vienna: D. Löwy. 1882.
- Presse und Judenthum [Press and Judaism] (in German). Vienna: D. Löwy. 1882.
- Sollen die Juden Christen Werden? [Should the Jews Become Christians?]. Vienna: O. Frank. 1884. Preface by Ernest Renan.
- Humanistische Bildung und der classische Unterricht [Humanistic Education and Classical Instruction] (in German). Vienna: C. Konegen. 1884.
- Briefe berühmter christlicher Zeitgenossen über die Judenfrage [Letters from Famous Christian Contemporaries on the Jewish Question] (in German). Vienna: O. Frank. 1885.
- Am Grabe meiner Mutter [On My Mother's Grave] (in German). 1888. Later translated into Hebrew.
- Le prestige de la France en Europe : appel d'un étranger à la nation française [France's Prestige in Europe: A Foreigner's Appeal to the French Nation] (in French). Paris: Alcan-Levy. 1890.
- La question juive [The Jewish Question] (in French). 1893.
- Anarchie et antisémitisme [Anarchy and Antisemitism] (in French). Paris: F. Chatelus. 1894.
- The Jewish Encyclopedia: A Descriptive Record of the History, Religion, Literature, and Customs of the Jewish People from the Earliest Times to the Present Day. New York: Funk & Wagnalls. 1901–1909.
- Der Juden kampf ums recht [The Jews' Fight for Justice] (in German). New York: E. Zunser. 1902.
- Russia at the Bar of the American People: A Memoir of Kinship. New York: Funk & Wagnalls. 1904. Memorial volume for the victims of the Kishinev pogrom. Introduction by Emil G. Hirsch.
- German Classics of the 19th and 20th Centuries. The German Publication Society. 1913–1914. With Kuno Francke, in twenty volumes.
- Social Justice: Eight Chapters from the Social Gospel of the Prophets and of Their Successors Throughout the Ages. New York: Isaac Goldmann Co. 1923. Introduction by Edward Filene. Published in honor of the golden jubilee convention of the Union of American Hebrew Congregations.
- A Religion of Truth, Justice, and Peace: A Challenge to Church and Synagogue to Lead in the Realization of the Social and Peace Gospel of the Hebrew Prophets. New York: The Amos Society. 1924. Introduction by Edward Filene and epilogue by Israel Zangwill.
