= Antisemitic League of France =

French nationalist and antisemitic organization founded in 1889

- Ligue nationale anti-sémitique de France
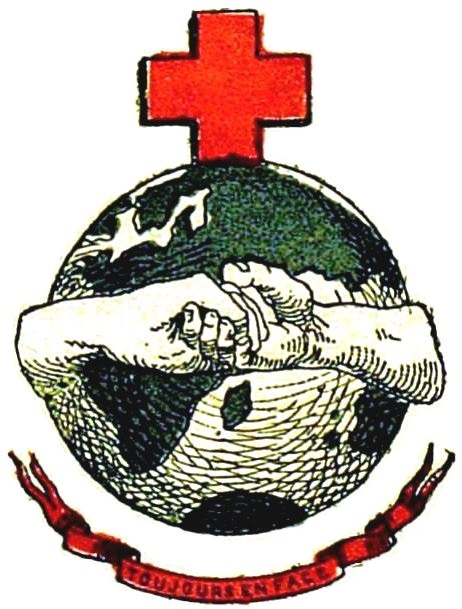
- Abbreviation: LNAF
- Formation: 1889
- Founder: Édouard Drumont; Jacques de Biez
- Dissolved: 1892
- Headquarters: Paris
- Members: c. 50–100
- Publication: La Libre Parole

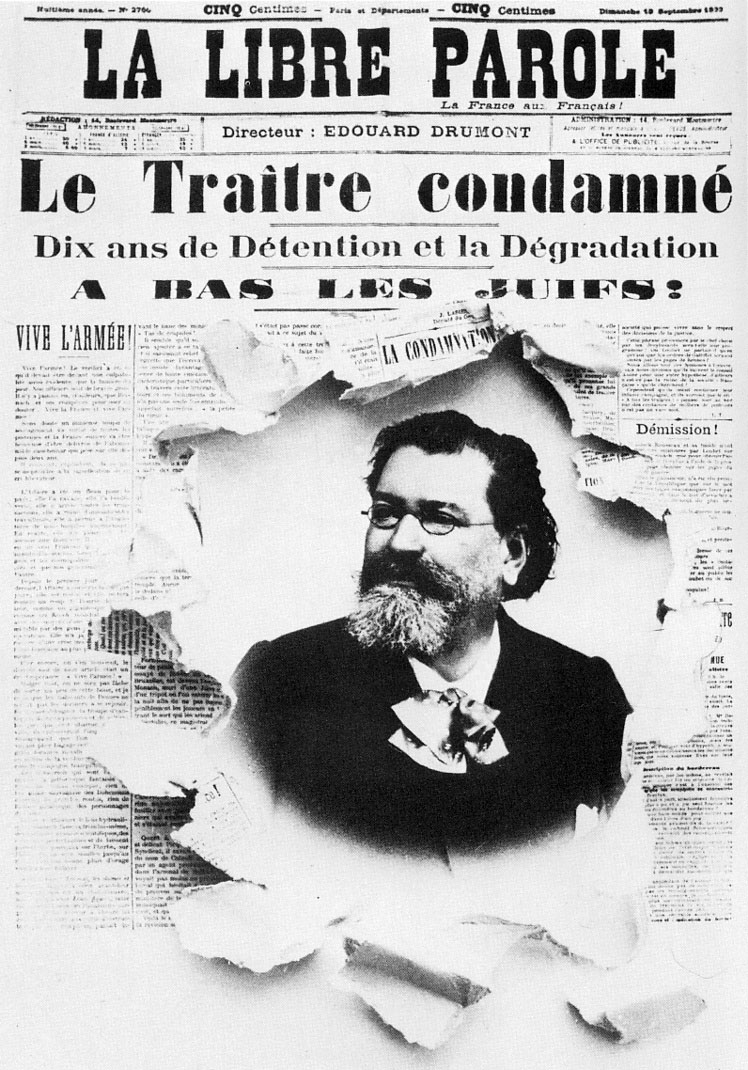
Drumont and his newspaper La Libre Parole (Free Speech), in 1899

The Antisemitic League of France (French: Ligue anti-sémitique de France) was founded in 1889 by journalist Edouard Drumont, with the support of other right-wing French antisemites such as Jacques de Biez, Albert Millot, and Marquis de Morès.

First known under the name of Ligue nationale antisémitique de France (National Antisemitic League of France) or Ligue antisémite française (French Antisemitic League), this nationalist league was particularly active during the Dreyfus Affair. Beside spreading antisemitic propaganda, the League was also anti-Masonry and anti-Communist. It had as general delegates Jacques de Biez. Jules Guérin was an active member of it. The League was located on rue Lepic in Paris.

Its 1889 foundation was inspired by the success of Drumont's antisemitic pamphlet La France juive (1886), and also by the Boulangist crisis. It was supported by newspapers such as Drumont's La Libre Parole; Jules Guérin's French weekly L'Antijuif (fr) (Paris, 1896-1902); the daily La Cocarde (fr) (1888-1907) founded by Georges de Labruyère (fr) and edited September 1894 - March 1895 by Maurice Barrès; Henri Rochefort's L'Intransigeant; and the Catholic newspaper La Croix.

Beside propaganda, the League also organized antisemitic demonstrations and provoked some riots, a method later generalized by the far-right leagues in France. It denounced the Panama scandals, took side against Alfred Dreyfus and spread conspiracy theories concerning the Masonry's alleged activities in the Third Republic.

After a disagreement between Drumont and Guérin in 1899, the League became, under the direction of Guérin, the Grand Occident de France, still antisemitic but even more anti-Masonic, the name itself being a reaction against the Masonic Grand Orient de France. It was thereafter essentially linked to Guérin's newspaper, L'Antijuif. The League progressively disappeared after the "Fort Chabrol" affair and the arrest of Guérin. After an initial surge during the Dreyfus Affair, far right leagues appeared again during the interwar period.
