= L'Antijuif =

French weekly newspaper

- Type: Weekly newspaper
- Owner: Ligue antisémitique de France
- Editor: Jules Guérin
- Launched: 21 August 1898
- Ceased publication: 5 February 1899
- Language: French
- Headquarters: 51 rue de Chabrol
- City: Paris
- Country: France
- ISSN: 2113-4693
- OCLC number: 759777145

L'Antijuif was a French antisemitic weekly newspaper and official organ of the Grand Occident de France, (originally named antisemitic league of France) edited by anti-Dreyfusard Jules Guérin. Published in Paris from 1898 to 1899, over 40,000 copies were regularly printed, with the paid copies sold at 10 cents each, while over half of all copies were distributed as free propaganda.

== History ==
This newspaper first launched on 21 August 1898, during the Dreyfus Affair, as a competition to La Libre Parole, with the financial support of the Duc d'Orléans and other substantial donations from individual royalists, such as Boni de Castellane. The newspaper established headquarters at 51 rue de Chabrol in Paris in April 1899.

The publication ceased with the imprisonment of Guérin—who defied arrest for five weeks at the newspaper's headquarters—for planning a coup d'état against the republic (alongside Paul Déroulède). The Ligue launched a successor periodical, Le petit antijuif de l'Est, on the 11t of March 1900, under the direction of Jules Guérin's brother, Louis Guérin. This publication defined itself as the "regional organ" the Grand Occident de France and ceased publication in 1909. Other regional publications were subsequently launched such as Le Petit Antijuif de Lyon (1901 to 1902) and Le Petit Antijuif de Paris, which launched in 1902 but ceased to exist after 2 publications.

After his surrender, the High Court sentenced Jules Guérin to banishment and exile. He nevertheless continued his antisemitic activities and propaganda until his death in Paris in 1910.

He was buried in the Montmartre Cemetery in an unmarked grave until The Jules Guérin Memorial Association, founded in 1994, started to update and maintain his tomb.
