= Max Régis =

French journalist and politician (1873–1950)

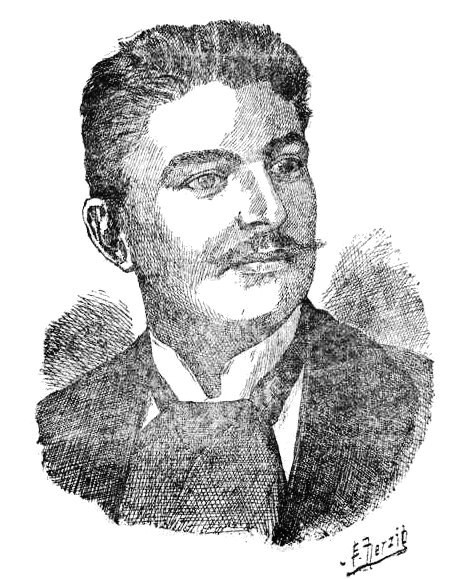
- Born: Massimiliano Régis Milano; 8 June 1873; Sétif, Algeria
- Died: 1950; Hautes-Pyrénées, France
- Occupations: Journalist, politician, hotelier
- Known for: Antisemitism

Max Régis (8 June 1873 – 1950) was a French journalist and politician who promoted anti-semitism in French Algeria during the late 1890s. He was elected mayor of Algiers in 1898 but was soon dismissed from office. He campaigned unsuccessfully for election as a national deputy in 1901 as an antisemitic candidate. He lived the rest of his life in obscurity.

== Social context ==
During the later part of the 19th century the civil territories of Algeria, dominated by settlers, were officially part of France and had many of the same laws and political features as metropolitan France. Jews had lived in Algeria for centuries, including some who came from Spain in the late 15th century. The 35,000 Jews spoke Arabic but were oppressed by the 2.5 million Arab Muslims. The Jews welcomed the French as liberators, and by the 1870 Crémieux Decree were made full French citizens, while the Arabs had no civil rights. Antisemitism became a feature of politics after 1870. There were violent anti-Jewish incidents between 1881 and 1884, and in 1889. During the 1890s Algeria was affected by an economic depression. Further incidents began during 1894 in response to the Dreyfus affair. This scandal rousing antisemitic passions in metropolitan France and among the Pied-Noir French colonists in Algeria.

== Life ==
=== Early years ===
Massimiliano Régis Milano was born on 8 June 1873 at Sétif in French Algeria. His family was Italian in origin. Max Régis, as he became known, was brought up in a comfortable middle-class home near to Algiers. At the age of 10 he went to study at the Lycée Louis-le-Grand, then returned to the High School of Algiers, and finally passed his baccalaureate in Montpellier. He spent a year studying at the Law Faculty of Algiers, then became chief editor of his home town newspaper Le Progrès de Sétif. At the age of 21 Max Régis fought a duel with an officer named Perroux, and relocated to Tunis for two months to avoid arrest. He was ordered to military service with the 12th artillery regiment in Oran. After his discharge he returned to Algiers to continue his legal studies.

=== Antisemitic activist ===
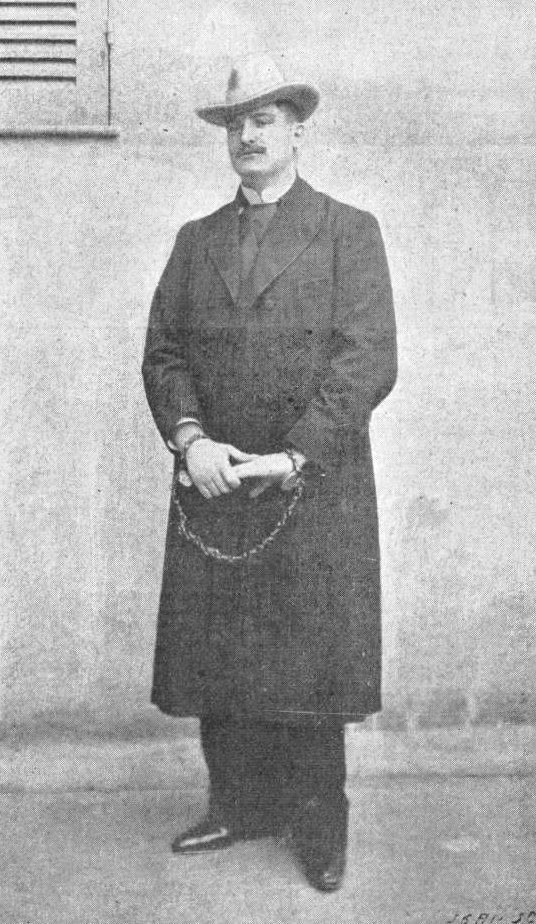
Max Régis in prison in Algiers.

At the start of 1897 Max Régis and his brother Louis organized student protests against the appointment of a Jewish professor of Law named Lévy. Max Régis gained the nickname "beau Max". He was "tall, handsome, strong and energetic", and charismatic. As a result of his activism he was suspended from university for two years. Soon after he was named president of the Ligue Antijuive (Anti-Jewish League), and on 14 July 1897 initiated the antisemitic newspaper L'Antijuif d'Alger. L'Anti-Juif had a print run of 20,000 copies, a large number for Algeria at this time. The Algiers Anti-Jewish League became important among the settlers. It organized petitions and demonstrations against Jews and government officials. Max Régis directed the Fighting Radicals, an anti-capitalist and socialist political group.

The funeral of the founder of the Algiers Ligue Antisémitique was held in September 1897. The prefect of Algiers made mass arrests at the event, a mistake that Regis exploited to increase emotions. Protest meetings and student marches began on 18 January 1898. The Jews fought back, and there were injuries on both sides. When a Christian rioter was killed his funeral became a large antisemitic rally. One Jew was beaten to death. There were more than 100 injuries and more than 600 demonstrators were arrested. Regis had his devotees rampage in nine towns in which two Jews and one other were killed, 158 shops were burned and several synagogues were desecrated. The government was slow to suppress the violence. After six days of mob violence in Algiers the Jewish quarter was wrecked.

On 20 February 1898 at an antisemitic meeting in the Salle Chaynes in Paris Régis said, "We will water the tree of liberty with the blood of Jews. This threat was printed in Le Réveil algérien that year. At the start of March 1898 Max Regis was among the speakers criticizing Jews and their "Dreyfusard servants" at a meeting of 800 people in the Salle Wagram in Paris. Other speakers were Charles Devos, Édouard Duboc and Jules Guérin. On 16 March 1898 Régis fought a duel in Algiers with Captain Oger, who had been insulted during the Anti-juif. On 17 March 1898 the Court of Appeal in Algiers confirmed a judgement that sentenced Régis to four months in prison. He was arrested on 21 March 1898.

For the national elections of May 1898, Régis endorsed Édouard Drumont, author of the antisemitic pamphlet La France juive (Jewish France), theoretician of antisemitism in France, in the elections to the national legislature in Algiers. On 8 May 1898 Édouard Drumont was elected with 11,557 votes against 2,328 and 1,741 for his opponents. Of six Algerian national deputies, four were elected as part of Regis's Anti-Jewish League. At almost the same date, Max Régis was elected mayor of Algiers at the age of 25, but his election was annulled.

=== Mayor of Algiers ===
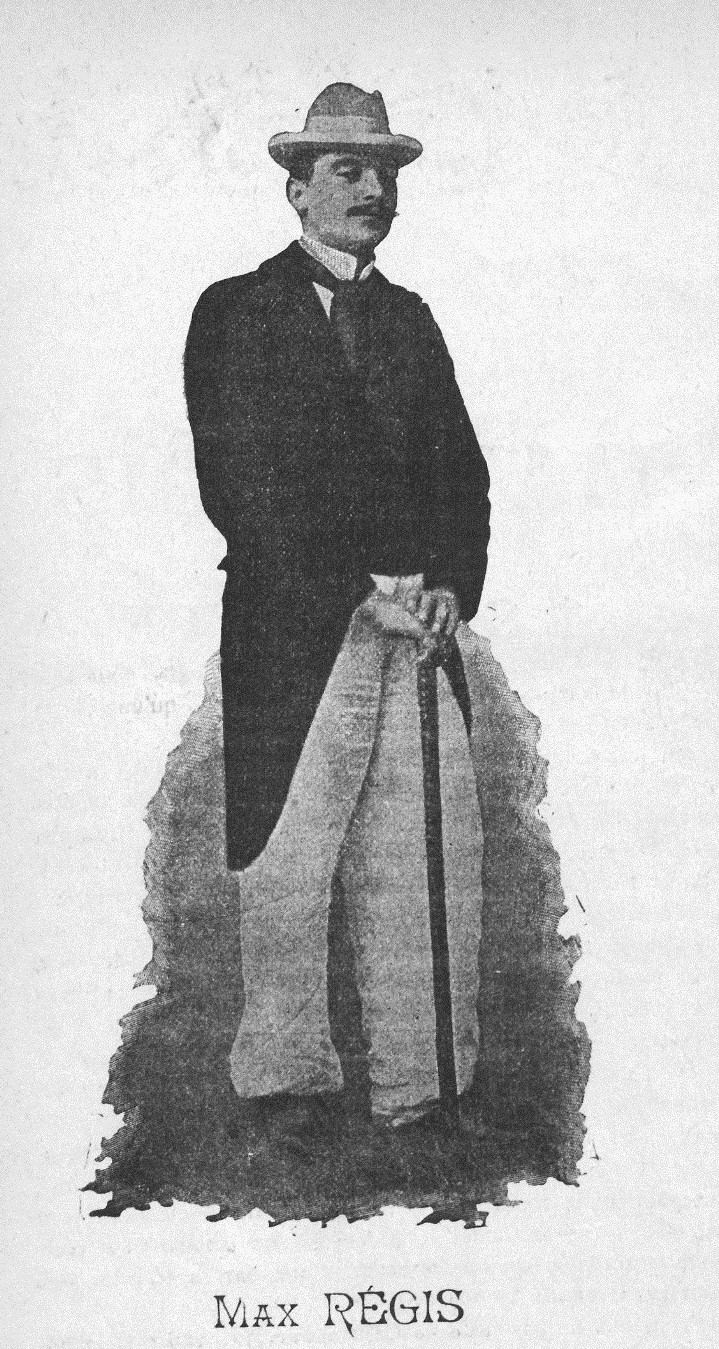
Max Régis in 1898

All 36 municipal councillors elected in Algiers in November 1898 were antisemitic. Max Régis, their leader, said of the Jews, "now they will all have to starve." On 20 November 1898 the Antijuif said, "The Jews must leave and they must leave voluntarily today, for if they do not they will by forced to leave tomorrow." As mayor of Algiers, the first measures of Régis were:

- Cafes that receive Jews cannot have a terrace
- No loitering for hawkers
- Jewish coachmen must park at specified locations
- The Municipal Theater is closed to Jews

Looting of Jewish shops became frequent. The Algerian antisemitism was so powerful that Regis spoke of autonomy: "If the French refuse to liberate themselves from the Jews, the Algerian people will take its destiny into its own hands!" A month later, on 12 December 1898, Max Regis was suspended for three months as mayor of Algiers. M. Lutaud was appointed prefect of the city. On 26 December 1898 Régis opposed M. Le Pic in a duel. The two men were slightly injured. On 9 January 1899 Max Régis was removed from office as mayor of Algiers after making insults against the authorities. The Governor General Édouard Laferrière arranged for his removal.

=== Later career ===
On 22 February 1899 Max Régis was sentenced by the Criminal Court to three years in prison and a fine. The French government began to suppress antisemitic activities while accepting some of the demands of the more moderate autonomist settlers. Regis's youth groups were banned and their meeting places were closed. He spent his time either hiding in his "Villa Antijuive" or in Spain. The number of his endorsers decreased to a rump of autonomists from lower-class Spanish areas.

In January 1901 Max Régis campaigned in a Paris by-election against the Socialist Jean Allemane. He was endorsed by Drumont but had little or no backing from the Ligue des Patriotes and Ligue de la patrie française, and failed to be elected. In 1901 Régis was involved in a tavern brawl with a rival. The incident further discredited him and marked the end of the Jewish crisis in Algeria. Anti-Semitic politics in France began to dissolve into minor groups as the 1902 national elections approached. Little is known of the remainder of Max Régis's life. Apparently he became a hotel keeper. In 1910 he married in Beausoleil, Alpes-Maritimes. He died in obscurity in the Hautes-Pyrénées in 1950.

== Publications ==
- Régis, Max (1899), Gardais, Louis (ed.), Les mémoires du prisonnier Max Régis / recueillis par son ami Louis Gardais. Suite des mémoires du prisonnier Max Régis..., Mustapha : impr. de "l'Antijuif"

== Sources ==
- Ben, Myriam (1999), Quand les cartes sont truquées : Mémoires (in French), Editions L'Harmattan
- Benbassa, Esther (2001-07-02), The Jews of France: A History from Antiquity to the Present, Princeton University Press, ISBN 1-4008-2314-5
- Bouveresse, Jacques (2008), Un parlement colonial: les délégations financières algériennes, 1898-1945 (in French), Publication Univ Rouen Havre, ISBN 978-2-87775-876-5
- Centre de documentation juive contemporaine (2001), Revue d'histoire de la Shoah: le monde juif (in French), La revue du Centre de documentation juive contemporaine

"L'AFFAIRE DREYFUS - Varia", Chrono Dreyfus (in French), archived from the original on 2012-07-10

- Fuller, Robert Lynn (2012-04-23), The Origins of the French Nationalist Movement, 1886-1914, McFarland, ISBN 978-0-7864-9025-7
- Harpon, Marc (31 March 2009), Alger 1898. La grande vague antijuive par Pierre Hebey (in French)
- Lafitte, Fernand (1898), Max Régis et son oeuvre, Algiers: Ernest Mallebay
- Marrus, Michael Robert; Paxton, Robert O. (1995), Vichy France and the Jews, Stanford University Press, ISBN 978-0-8047-2499-9
- Micaleff, André (2008), Le mur de silence: petite chronique allemande (in French), L'Harmattan, ISBN 9782296059511
- Michelbach, Pierre (January 1994), "Max Régis, le Drumont d'Alger", L'Histoire (in French) (173)
- Read, Piers Paul (2012-02-02), The Dreyfus Affair, A&C Black, ISBN 978-1-4088-0139-0
- Roche, Sylviane (1997), Le temps des cerises: roman, TheBookEdition, ISBN 978-2-9535636-0-3
- Zack, Lizabeth (2005), "Regis, Max (1873-1950)", Antisemitism: A Historical Encyclopedia of Prejudice and Persecution, ABC-CLIO, ISBN 978-1-85109-439-4
