= Adolphe Lalauze =

French etcher (1838–1906)

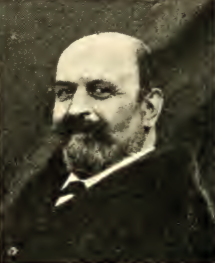
- Lalauze in 1898
- Born: 8 October 1838; Rive-de-Gier, Loire, France
- Died: 18 October 1906 (aged 68); Milly-la-Forêt, Essonne, France
- Occupation: Engraver
- Known for: Book illustrations

Adolphe Lalauze (8 October 1838 – 18 October 1906) was a prolific French etcher who made the illustrations for many books. He won various awards and was made a knight of the Legion of Honour.

== Life ==
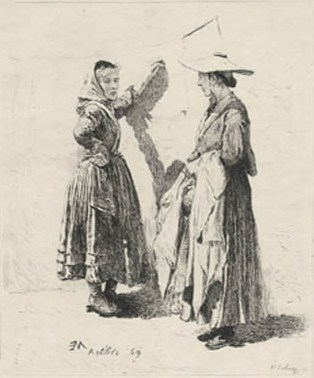
Lavandieres, Antibes (Washerwomen, Antibes) 1869

Adolphe Lalauze was born in Rive-de-Gier, Loire, on 8 October 1838. His first job was a Contrôleur de l'Enregistrement. Lalauze worked in this civil service job in Toulouse for some time, then enrolled at the Toulouse École des Beaux-arts. He moved to Paris, where he became a student of Léon Gaucherel. Encouraged by Gaucherel, he took up etching, and first exhibited at the Salon in 1872. At the Salon of 1876 he exhibited twenty-one etchings. These included a series of nine called Le Petit Monde (The Small World) that depicted childhood scenes using his children as models, which won a 3rd class medal. He won a 2nd class medal at the Salon of 1878 for twelve plates illustrating the Histoires ou contes du temps passé by Charles Perrault.

Lalauze illustrated many books. He drew the Frontispiece for Le Bric-à-brac de l'amour (1879) published by Octave Uzanne. This book used revolutionary new photo-mechanical reproduction techniques. He illustrated the Peter Anthony Motteux translation of Don Quixote, first published in 1879. Lalauze made 21 etchings for the 1881 edition of Galland's translation of the Arabian Nights, and these were reproduced in several other editions. He was one of the illustrators of Damase Jouaust's 1882 Petite Bibliothėque artistique (Small Art Library), along with Pierre Edmond Alexandre Hédouin and Émile Boilvin. He created illustrations for Walter Scott's Waverley Novels published in Boston in 1893–94. In 1898 his illustrations in the pure fin de siècle style appeared in Sophie Arnould, actress and wit by Robert B. Douglas.

Adolphe Lalauze was a member of the Société des Artistes Français. He died in Milly-la-Forêt, Essonne in 1906. His son, Alphonse Lalauze, was also an artist.

== Work ==
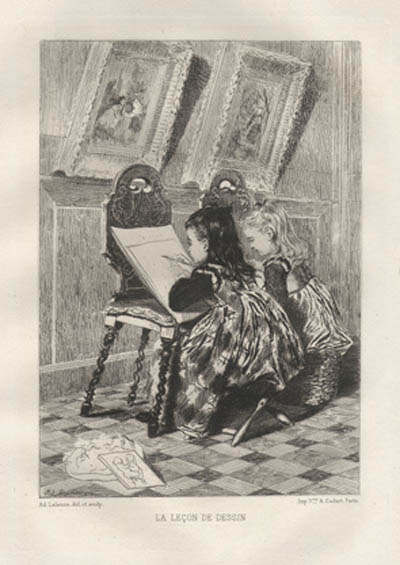
La Leçon de Dessin (The Drawing Lesson) 1880

Lalauze was known for etchings that depicted children, using his own children as models. He also made etchings that interpreted work by such artists as Charles Bargue, Pieter Codde, Alexandre-Gabriel Decamps, Juan Antonio Gonzalez, Charles Green, Antoine-Jean Gros, Jean-Baptiste Huet, Pierre-Paul Prud'hon, David Teniers, Giovanni Battista Tiepolo, and Diego Velázquez. Lalauze made color prints by superimposing etched boards.

Some of his larger plates included "Love Story" after Frank Dicksee, "A Kiss from the Sea" after Hamilton Macallum and "The Entry of Charles V into Antwerp" after Hans Makart. His best work included "The Halt" after Jean-Louis-Ernest Meissonier, etched for the magazine L'Art, and "Portrait of Madame Pompadour" after Maurice Quentin de La Tour, published by the Société des Artistes Français.

During his lifetime he was called "one of the most skillful original etchers of the modern French school." An 1889 book described him as an etcher with extreme facility who composed elegant vignettes and frontispieces. Later, Claude Roger-Marx criticized him for having fallen from interpretive drawing into a "laborious work of illustration" and of multiplying small compositions and vignettes.

== Awards and distinctions ==
- 1876 Salon Medal 3rd class
- 1878 Salon Medal 2nd class
- 1889 Bronze Medal at the Exposition Universelle
- 1895 Knight of the Legion of Honor,
- 1900 Gold Medal at the Exposition Universelle

== Gallery ==
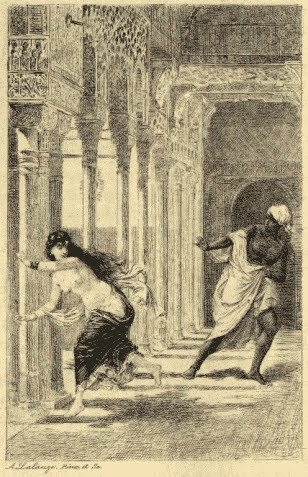
Arabian Nights illustration

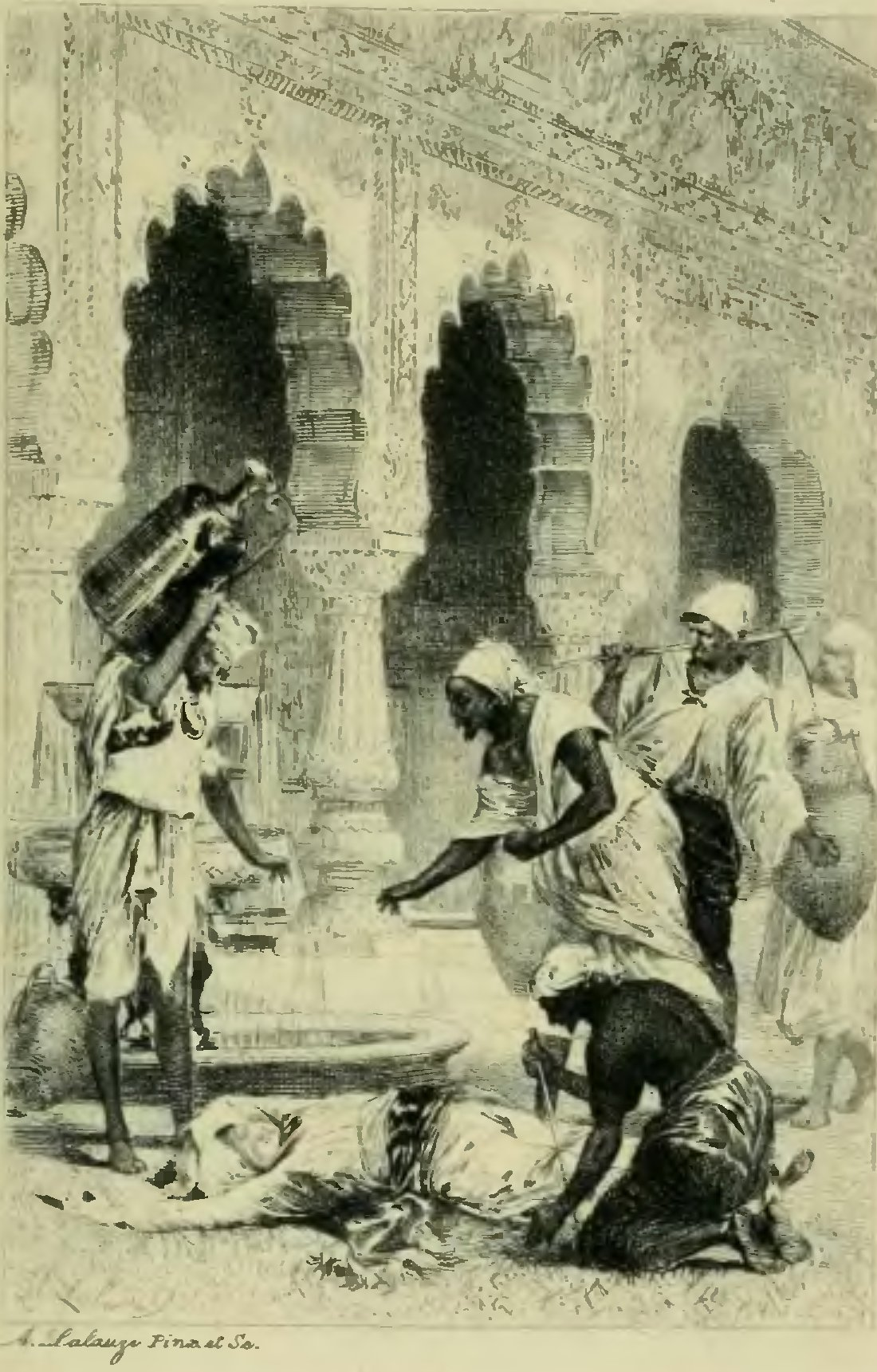
Arabian Nights illustration

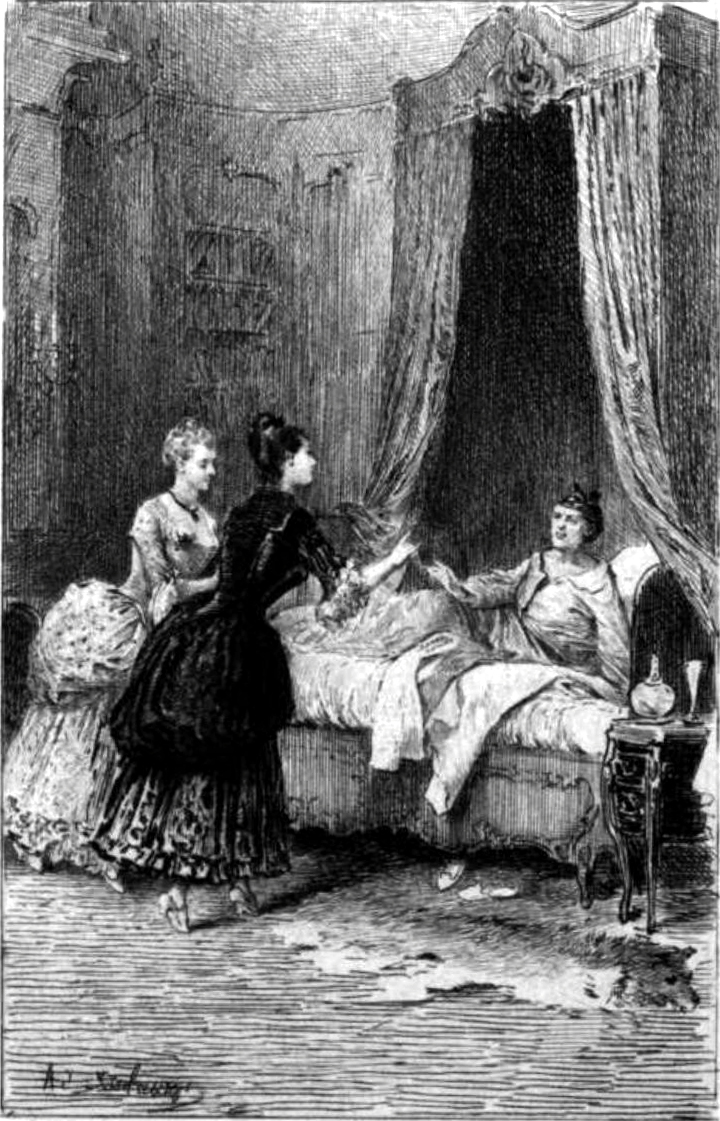
Illustration from the Confessions du comte de *** by Charles Pinot Duclos

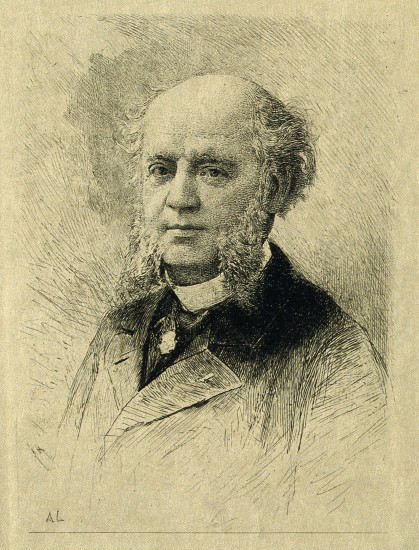
Pierre-Charles-Henri Fauvel 1892

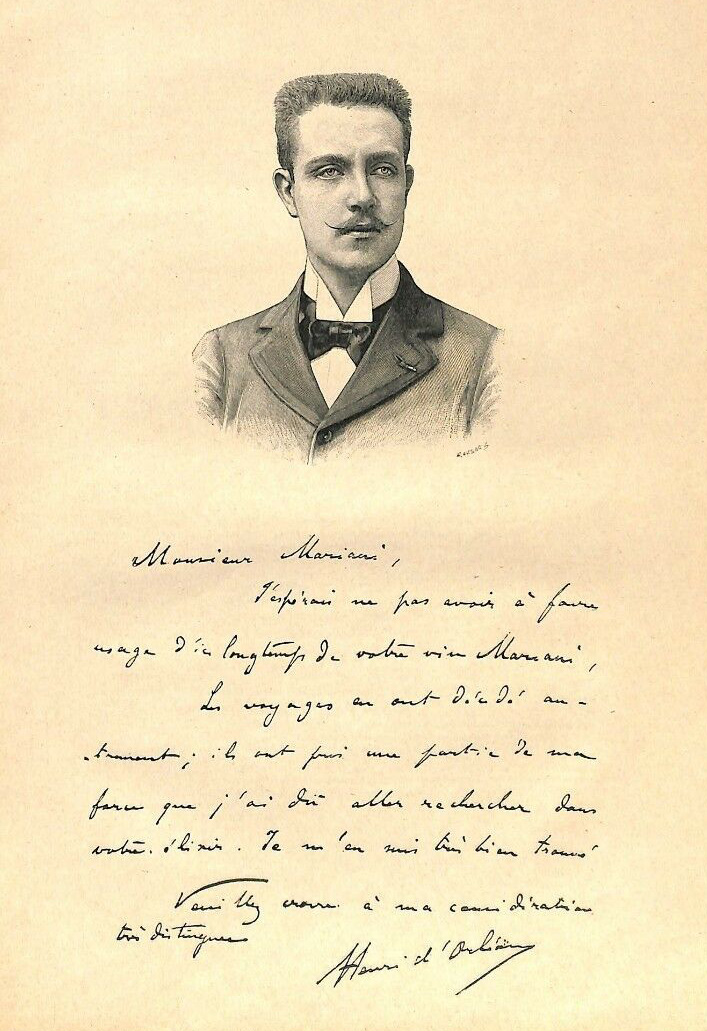
French explorer Prince Henri of Orléans (1867–1901) c. 1897

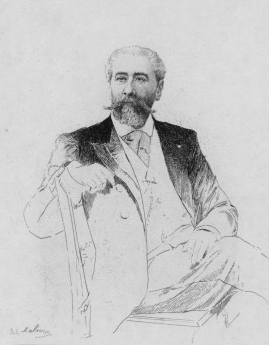
French poet José-Maria de Heredia (1842–1905) c. 1897

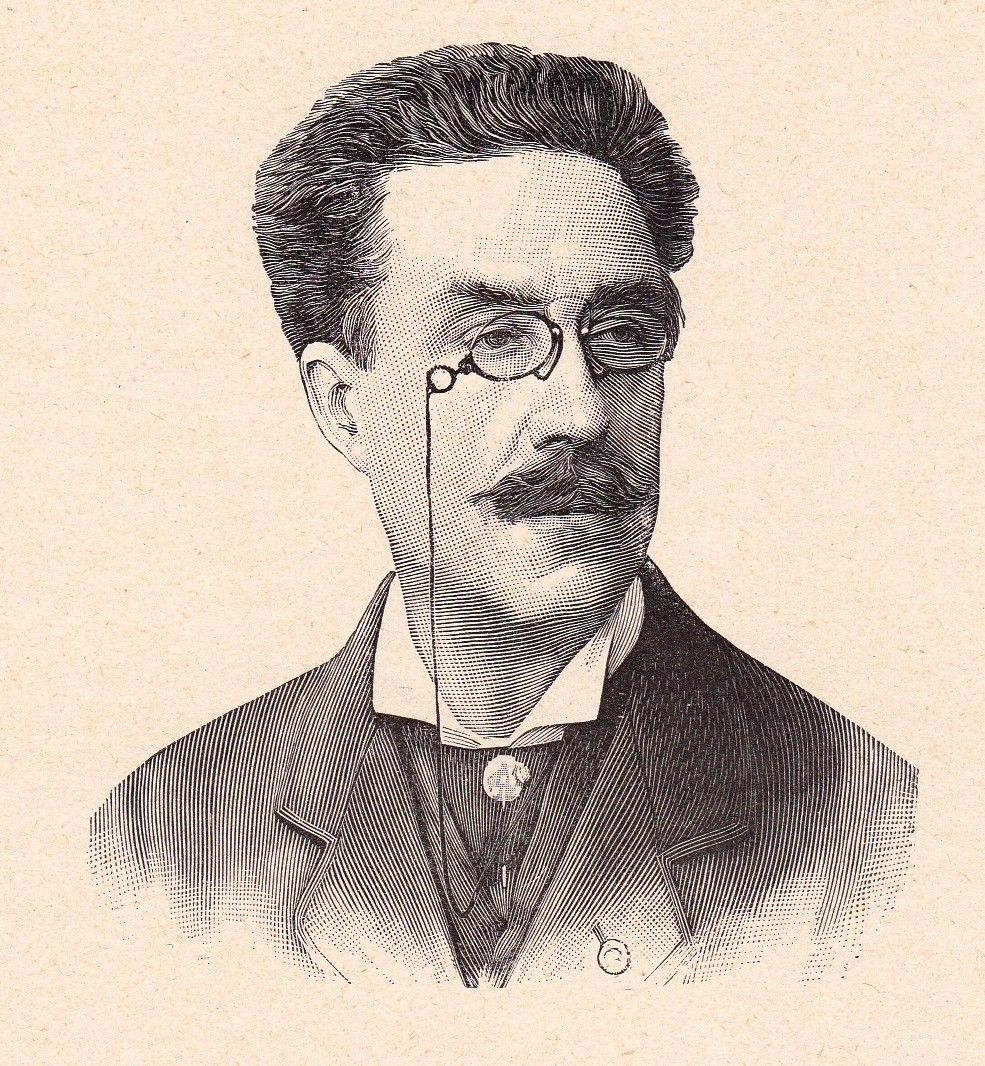
French sculptor Emmanuel Frémiet (1824–1910) c. 1897

== Sources ==
- "Adolphe Lalauze". Idbury Prints.
- Bendann, David (1891). Modern etchers: short biographical sketches of the leading etchers of the present day, 1891. D. Bendann. p. 71.
- Béraldi, Henri (1889). Les graveurs du XIXe siècle: guide de l'amateur d'estampes modernes. L. Conquet.
- Brivet, Hughes (31 December 2008). "Adolphe Lalauze (1838–1906)". alceste-art. Archived from the original on 11 February 2010.
- Frye, Northrop; Frye, Helen Kemp (1996). The Correspondence of Northrop Frye and Helen Kemp, 1932–1939: 1932–1935. University of Toronto Press. ISBN 978-0-8020-0772-8.
- Heritage Auctions, Inc. (2010). Rare Books Auction #6043. Heritage Capital Corporation. ISBN 978-1-59967-464-3.
- Nébrac, Claude-Jean (November 2011). Les petites histoires de l'opéra baroque en France. BoD – Books on Demand France. ISBN 978-2-8106-1950-4.
- Silverman, Willa Z. (2008). The New Bibliopolis: French Book Collectors and the Culture of Print, 1880–1914. University of Toronto Press. p. 26. ISBN 978-0-8020-9211-3.
- Yamanaka, Yuriko; Nishio, Tetsuo (2006). The Arabian Nights and Orientalism: Perspectives from East and West. I.B.Tauris. ISBN 978-1-85043-768-0.
