= Jules Guérin =

French journalist and antisemitic activist (1860–1910)

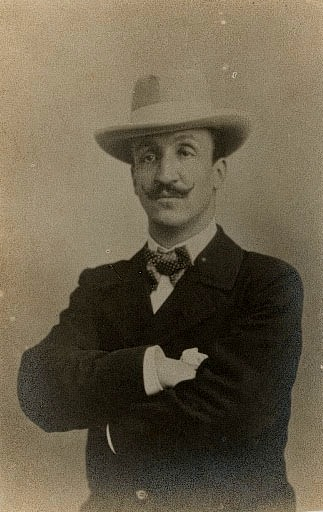
- Born: September 14, 1860; Madrid, Kingdom of Spain
- Died: February 10, 1910 (aged 49); Paris, French Third Republic
- Occupations: Journalist and anti-Semitic activist
- Known for: Founded and led the Ligue Antisemitique

Jules Guérin (French pronunciation: [ʒyl ɡeʁɛ̃]; 14 September 1860 – 10 February 1910) was a French journalist and antisemitic activist. He founded and led the Antisemitic League of France (Ligue Antisémitique), an organisation similar to the Ligue des Patriotes, and edited the French weekly L'Antijuif (Paris, 1896–1902).

At the start of March 1898 Guérin was among the speakers attacking Jews and their "Dreyfusard servants" at a meeting of 800 people in the Salle Wagram in Paris. Other speakers were Charles Devos, Édouard Duboc and Max Régis. The Ligue was involved in many antisemitic and anti-Dreyfus protests during the Dreyfus Affair. After failing to gain financial backing from Radical and Socialist politicians for his antisemitic league and newspaper, he turned to royalists and announced himself an opponent of the Republican government. Guérin was financially supported by Prince Philippe, Duke of Orléans, the Orléanist claimant to the French throne, from 1898 to 1903.

In 1899 Guérin was involved in the activities of Paul Déroulède, who attempted to organise a coup d'état. He was eventually indicted, with Déroulède and his Ligue des Patriotes for conspiring against the State. Guérin refused to be taken and fortified his house in the Rue de Chabrol with a group of armed supporters. After 38 days of siege, he eventually gave himself up. The term Fort Chabrol for a siege situation is still in use in some French-speaking countries, even among law enforcement agencies. The Ligue was outlawed in November 1899 and Guérin was imprisoned for ten years.

== Sources ==
- Fuller, Robert Lynn (2012-04-23), The Origins of the French Nationalist Movement, 1886–1914, McFarland, ISBN 978-0-7864-9025-7
