= Paul Déroulède =

French author and politician (1846–1914)

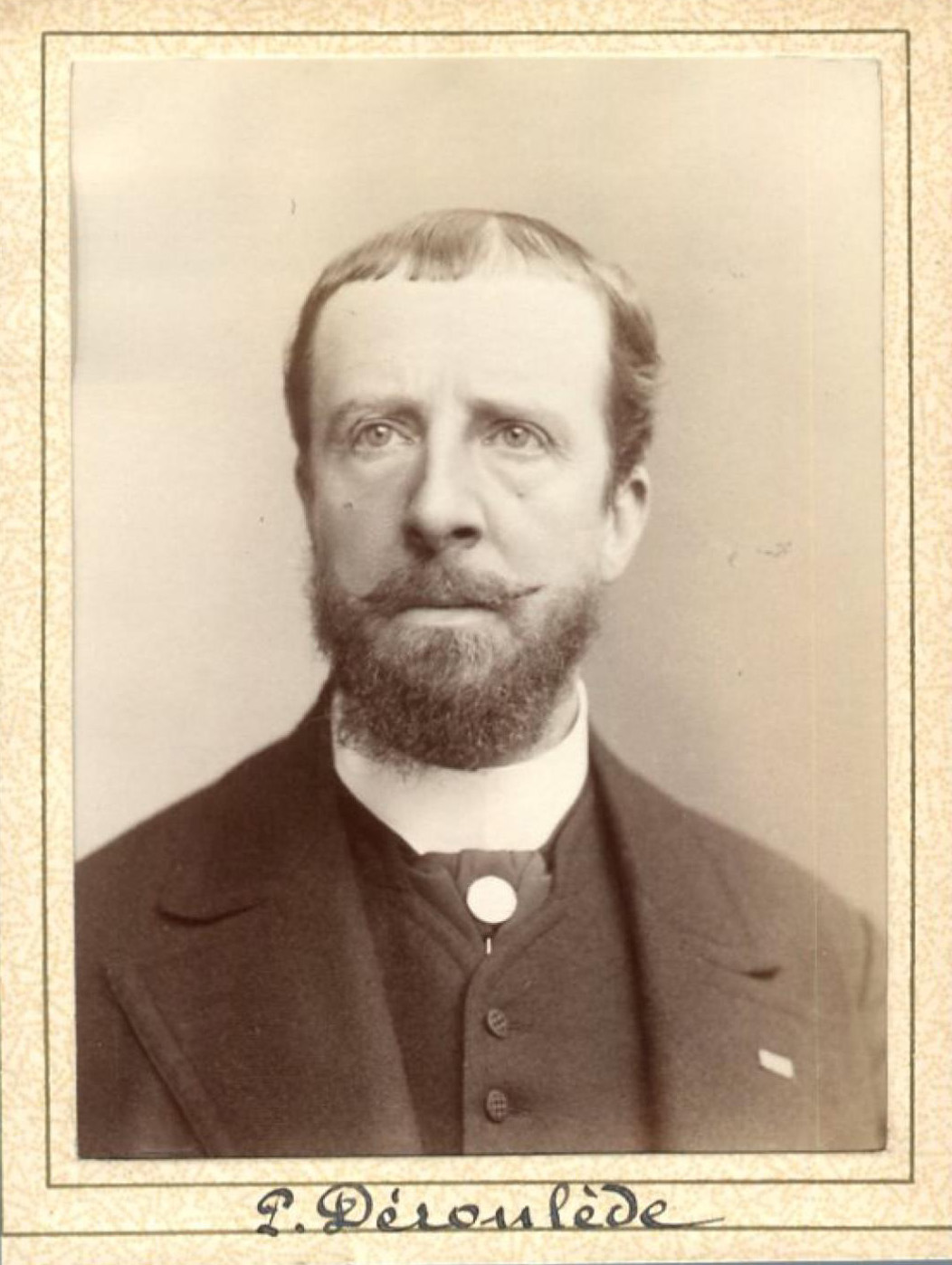
- Paul Déroulède, c. 1890s

Member of the Chamber of deputies
- In office 1898–1901
- Constituency: Charente
- In office 1889–1893
- Constituency: Charente

Personal details
- Born: 2 September 1846 Paris, France
- Died: 30 January 1914 (aged 67) Nice, France
- Party: League of Patriots
- Relations: Émile Augier (uncle)
- Education: Lycée Condorcet; Lycée Hoche; Lycée Louis-le-Grand; Faculté de droit de Paris
- Occupation: Playwright, writer, poet, politician
- Awards: Prix Montyon; Prix Jean-Reynaud; Chevalier de la Légion d'honneur
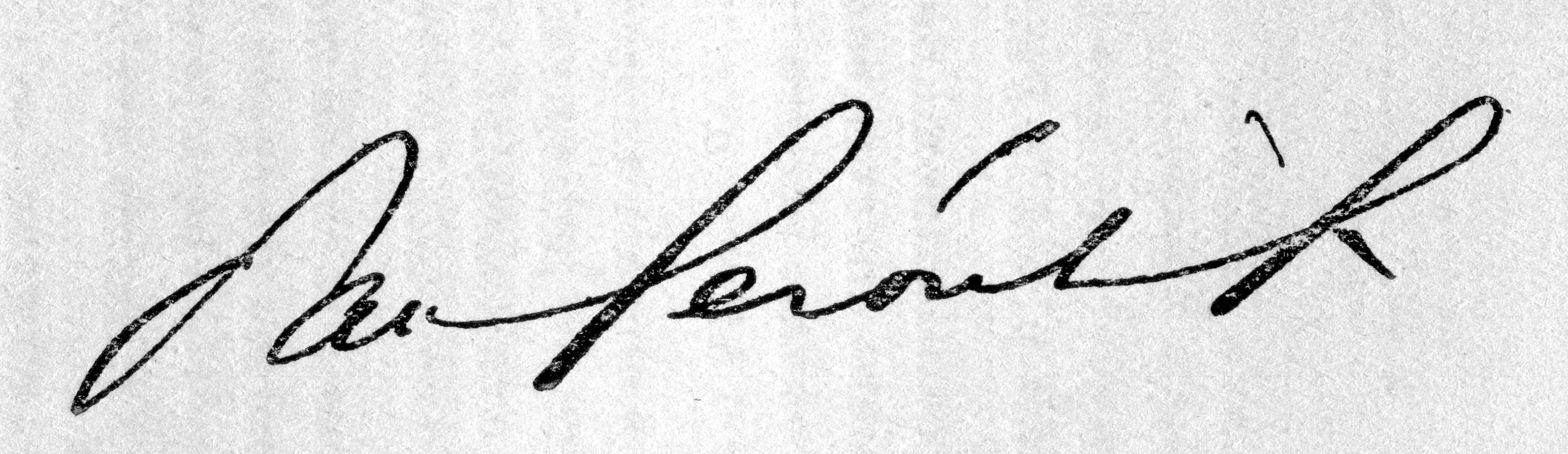
- Signature

Military service
- Allegiance: France
- Branch/service: French Army
- Years of service: 1870–1874
- Rank: Lieutenant
- Battles/wars: Franco-Prussian War

Paul Déroulède (2 September 1846 – 30 January 1914) was a French author and politician, one of the founders of the nationalist League of Patriots.

== Early life ==
Déroulède was born in Paris. He was published first as a poet in the magazine Revue nationale, with the pseudonym "Jean Rebel". In 1869 he produced, at the Théâtre Français, a one-act drama in verse named Juan Strenner.

=== Military career ===
At the beginning of the Franco-Prussian War he enlisted as a private, but was wounded and taken prisoner at the Battle of Sedan. He was sent to Breslau (now Wrocław), but escaped. He was given the Légion d'Honneur for his escape. He then served with generals Antoine Chanzy and Charles Denis Bourbaki, participated with the latter's disastrous retreat to Switzerland, and fought against the Paris Commune. After being promoted to lieutenant, he was forced by an accident to retire from the army.

== Early publications ==
In 1872, he published a collection of patriotic poems (Chants du soldat), which enjoyed great popularity. This was followed in 1875 by another collection, Nouveaux Chants du soldat. In 1877 he produced a drama in verse named L'Hetman, which derived a moderate success from the patriotic fervour of its sentiments. For the exhibition of 1878 he wrote a hymn, Vive la France, which was set to music by Charles Gounod. In 1880 his drama in verse, La Moabite, which had been accepted by the Théâtre Français, was censored for religious reasons.

== Political life ==
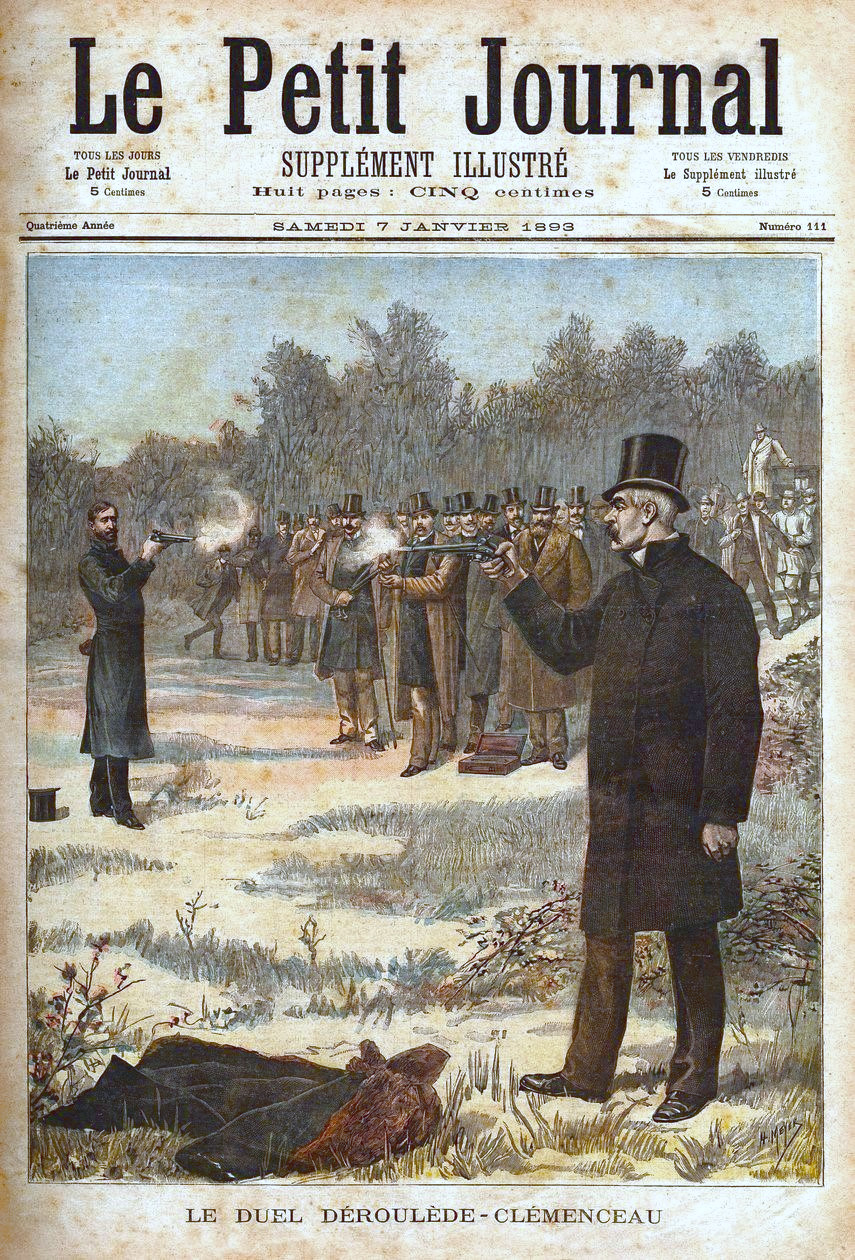
Duel between Georges Clemenceau and Paul Déroulède.

In 1882 Déroulède, along with the historian Henri Martin and Félix Faure, founded the Ligue des patriotes, to promote France's "revanche" against Germany. Déroulède served initially as the deputy to vice-president Faure, and the league quickly attained a membership of 182,000, a relatively large number for the time. Déroulède eventually became the president of the league, in March 1885. The league sought education reforms intended to increase patriotism among French students, but when those reforms were ignored by the French legislature Déroulède began to despair of "parliamentarism" as a method of reform.

After losing an election for the Chamber of Deputies in 1885, Déroulède decided that the parliamentary system adopted from Britain had sapped France of its vitality and virtue, and should be replaced by a presidential republic with the cabinet appointed by and responsible to a popularly elected president. Déroulède thus became a champion of constitutional revision and hoped to use the league as an organization to promote the cause among republican patriots. After the rise of General Georges Boulanger, Déroulède attempted to use the Ligue des Patriotes, until then a non-political organization, to assist his cause, but was deserted by many of the league's members and forced to resign his presidency. Nevertheless, he used the section that remained faithful to him with such effect that the government found it necessary in 1889 to decree its suppression.

During the same year, he was elected to the chamber as member for Angoulême. He was expelled from the chamber in 1890 for interrupting debates. He did not campaign for the election of 1893, but was re-elected in 1898, and distinguished himself by his vehemence as a nationalist and anti-Dreyfusard. After the funeral of President Félix Faure, on 23 February 1899, he endeavoured to persuade General Gaudérique Roget to lead his troops to the presidential palace. After the general and his troops first ignored and then dismissed Déroulède, he demanded to be arrested for treason. During his trial, Déroulède declared that if released he would continue his insurrectionary activity. He was triumphantly acquitted on 31 May, and on 12 August was again arrested and accused, together with André Buffet, Jules Guérin and others, of conspiracy against the republic. After a long trial before the French Senate serving as the high court, he was sentenced, on 25 January 1900, to ten years' banishment from France, and retired to San Sebastián in Spain.

As a member of the chamber Paul Déroulède was an opponent of colonialism, believing that it distracted from more pressing foreign policy issues in Europe, especially German control of Alsace and Lorraine. As he stated; 'I have lost two sisters and you offer me twenty servants."

Déroulède was also an Anglophile, believing that an alliance or agreement with Britain was essential for defending France against Germany and enabling the recapture of Alsace-Lorraine. His opposition to colonialism can also be seen as being associated with a desire for France not to alienate the British Empire by competing with it for foreign colonies.

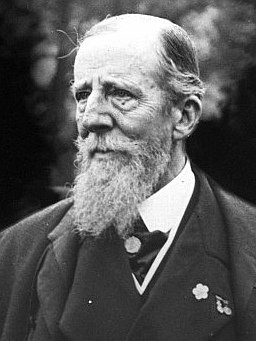
Deroulède in 1913

Déroulède became a prominent presence in the annual Franco-Prussian War commemorations around Paris, most notably at Champigny. By keeping memories of the defeat alive, Déroulède hoped to keep up pressure upon the government to implement political reforms and ultimately to take back Alsace-Lorraine.

He was the principal proponent of the anti-Semitic nationalist movement and suffered the dilemma of trying to decrease the anti-Semitism of the league during the Dreyfus Affair. After his banishment to Spain, the league became thoroughly anti-Semitic.

During 1901, he was again publicized by a quarrel with his Royalist allies, which resulted in an abortive attempt to arrange a duel with Buffet in Switzerland. In November 1905, however, the law of amnesty enabled him to return to France.

When Déroulède died in January 1914 his funeral procession in Paris attracted the largest crowds since that of the national hero Victor Hugo.

Déroulède's recommendation for a presidential republic with the cabinet appointed by and responsible to a popularly elected president was the basis of the French Fifth Republic introduced by Charles de Gaulle during the 1950s.

== Other publications ==
Besides the works already mentioned, he published the following:

- Le Sergent, in the Théâtre de campagne (1880)
- De l'éducation nationale (1882)
- Monsieur le Uhlan et les trois couleurs (1884)
- Le Premier grenadier de France (1886)
- La Tour d'Auvergne (1886)
- Le Livre de la ligue des patriotes (1887)
- Refrains militaires (1888)
- Histoire d'amour (1890)
- a pamphlet entitled Désarmement? (1891)
- Chants du paysan (1894)
- Poésies Militaires (1896)
- Messire du Guesclin, drame en vers (1895)
- La mort de Hoche (1897)
- La Plus belle fille du monde (1898).
