= Février =

Février is a French surname meaning February.

Notable people with this surname include:

- Audrey Février (born 1990), French football player
- Henry Février (1875–1957), French composer
- Jacques Février (1900–1979), French pianist
- James Germain Février (1895–1976), French historian
- Jules Février (1842–1937), French architect
- Pierre Février (1696–1760), French composer
- Stuart Charles-Fevrier (born 1959), Saint Lucian football manager
