= Willa Z. Silverman =

American writer (1959–2023)

Willa Zahava Silverman (March 1959 – October 2023) is an American writer.

After undergraduate studies at Harvard, Silverman received her doctorate in French Studies at New York University. She has published works as The Notorious Life of Gyp: Right-Wing Anarchist in Fin-de-Siècle France (1995), a biography of Sibylle Riqueti de Mirabeau—translated into French as Gyp, la dernière des Mirabeau, with a preface by Michel Winock—, and The New Bibliopolis: French Book Collectors and the Culture of Print 1880—1914 (2008).
