= Ligue des Patriotes =

Far-right political group in the French Third Republic

League of Patriots
- Ligue des Patriotes
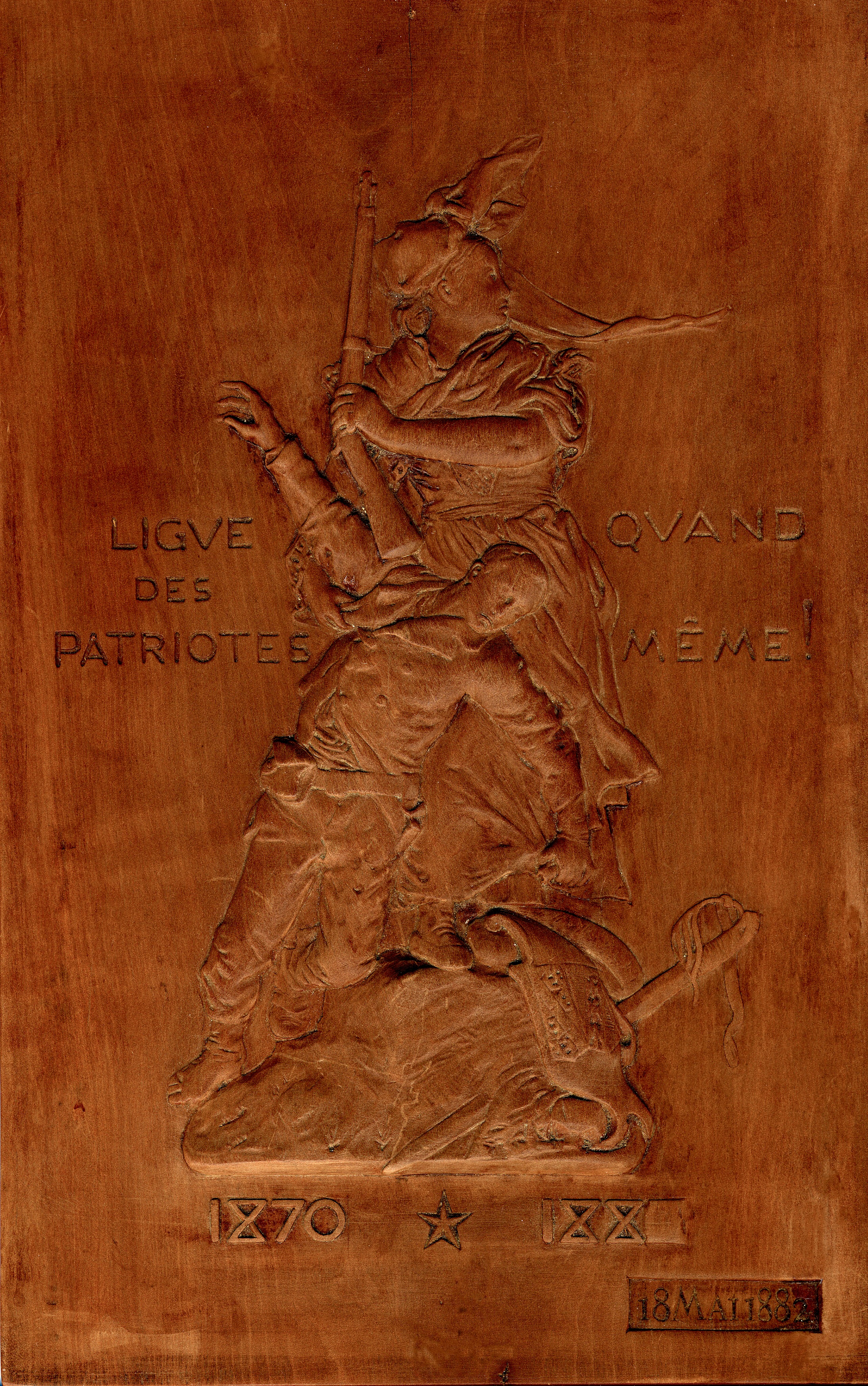
- Emblem by Antonin Mercié (1883)
- Leaders: Maurice Barrès; Georges Ernest Boulanger; Édouard de Castelnau; Paul Déroulède; Henri Martin
- Founded: 18 May 1882; 144 years ago
- Dissolved: June 1939; 87 years ago
- Country: France
- Active regions: Paris (headquarters)
- Ideology: French nationalism Revanchism; Antisemitism; Anti-Germanism
- Political position: Far-right
- Status: Inactive
- Size: 60,000 (1898 est.)

The League of Patriots (French: Ligue des Patriotes) was a French far-right league, founded in 1882 by the nationalist poet Paul Déroulède, historian Henri Martin and politician Félix Faure. The Ligue began as a non-partisan nationalist league, supported among others by writer Victor Hugo, calling for 'revanche' (revenge for the French defeat during the Franco-Prussian War) against the German Empire. One of the original purposes of the Ligue was to offer pre-military training, allowing members to participate in gymnastics and rifle shooting.

== History ==
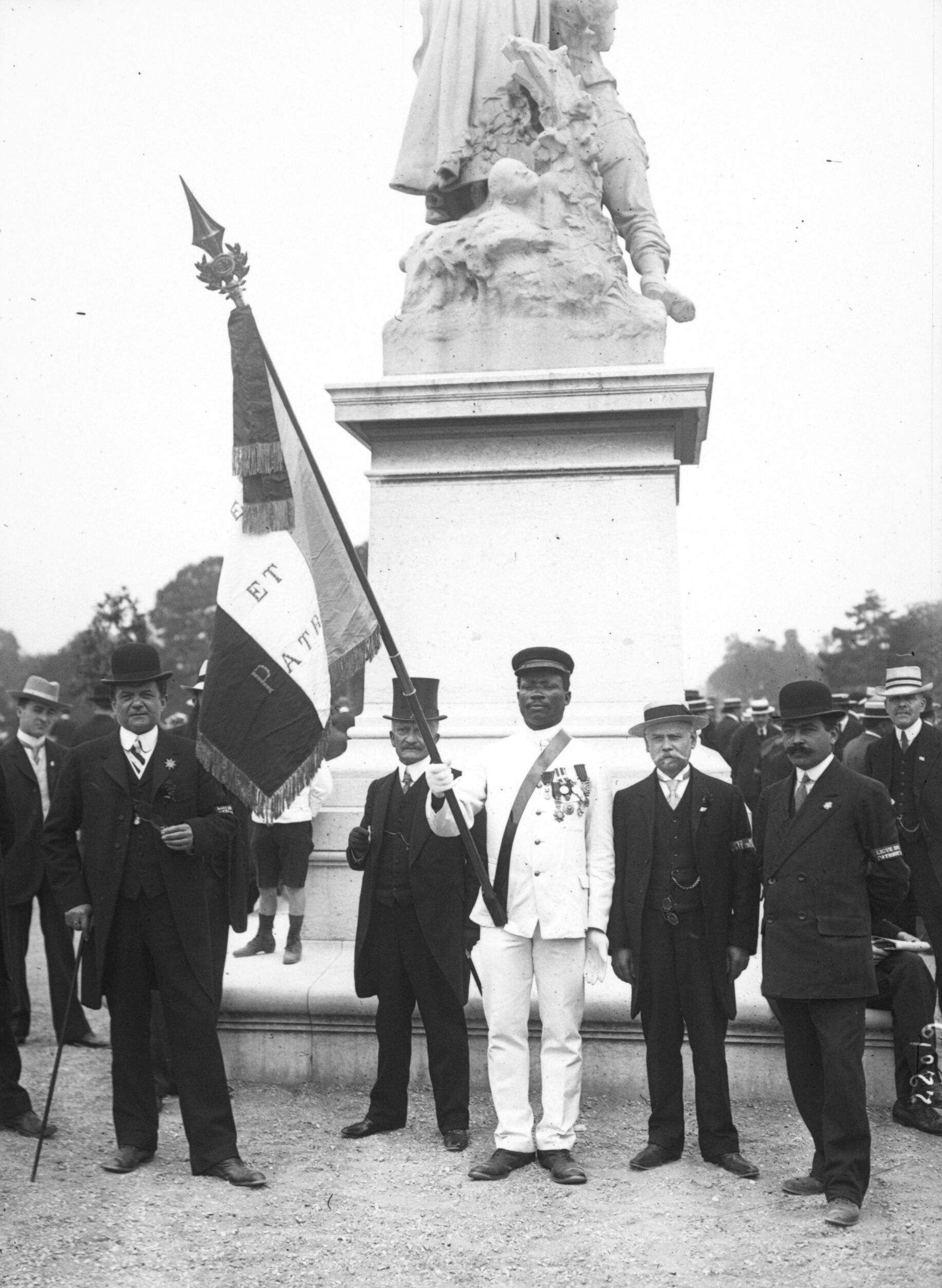
Ligue des Patriotes members in 1912

The league was formed with Léon Gambetta's blessing; Gambetta's education ministry included Déroulède in its Military Education Commission, which was also formed in 1882. However, during the Boulanger affair, Déroulède co-opted the Ligue to support the general, alienating many Republican members. After Boulanger's exile in 1889, the Ligue was suppressed by the government.

Upon the discovery that Victoria, the future German Empress, had stayed in Versailles and Saint-Cloud (a town destroyed during the Franco-Prussian War) during her unofficial visit to France in 1891, the Ligue incited a public uproar. The disorder surrounding the visit eventually resulted in the Crown Princess cutting her trip short and being escorted under French military protection, for her safety, to Calais to board a ship to England.

In 1898, the Ligue was revived to become involved in the Dreyfus affair engaging in noisy and often violent antisemitic, right-wing protests. At this stage, the Ligue is estimated to have had 60,000 members, largely in Paris.

After a failed coup d'état attempt in 1899 at the state funeral of President Félix Faure, one of the Ligue's founders who later distanced himself from its positions, Paul Déroulède was sentenced to exile from France for 10 years; the Ligue was again dissolved. Nevertheless, the nationalist author Maurice Barrès became again its leader in 1914, at the eve of World War I. Upon Barrès's death, General Édouard de Castelnau became leader, with Alexandre Millerand as president of honour. De Castelnau became head of the Fédération Nationale Catholique, which made him resign the leadership in 1926, as well as the presidency in 1932. The Ligue was definitely dissolved in the late 1930s, after General Denis Auguste Duchêne briefly reformed it in 1939.

== Notable members ==
- Ernest Boulanger, leader
- Paul Déroulède, founder
- Maurice Barrès, nationalist writer
