= Édouard Drumont =

French author and politician (1844–1917)

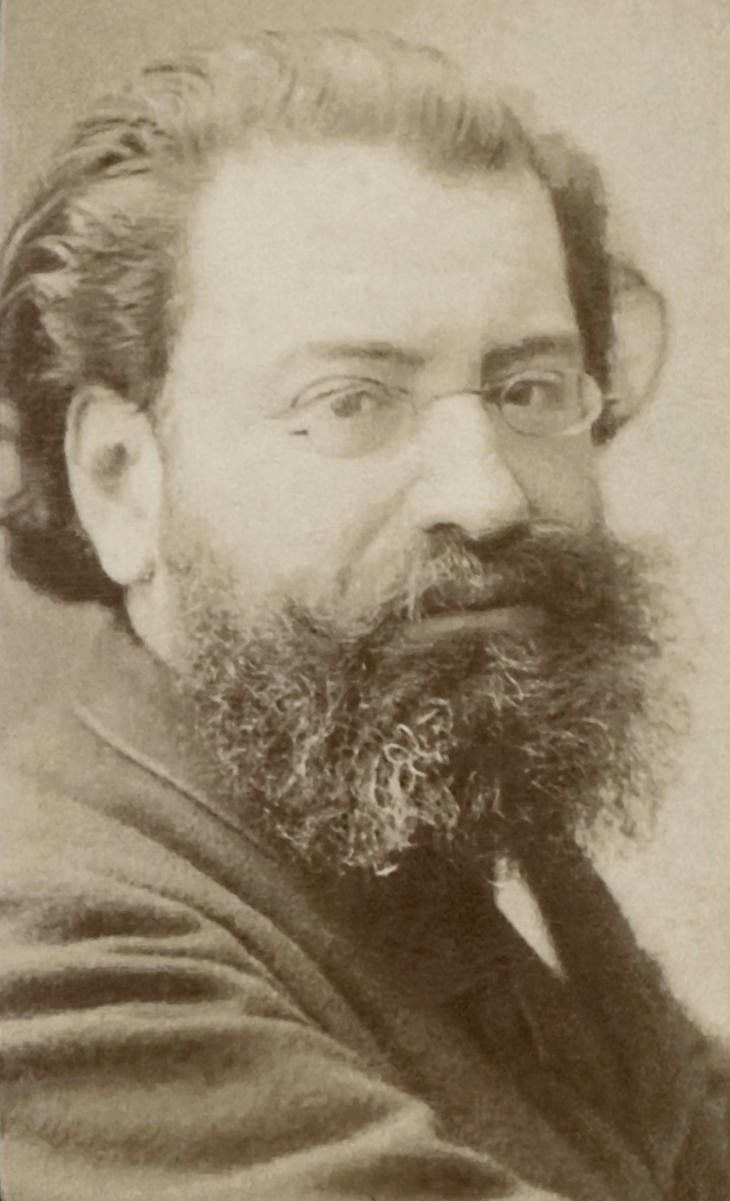
- Drumont in 1880
- Born: Édouard Adolphe Drumont; 3 May 1844; Paris, France
- Died: 5 February 1917 (aged 72)
- Occupations: Politician, journalist, author

Édouard Adolphe Drumont (French pronunciation: [edwaʁ dʁymɔ̃]; 3 May 1844 – 5 February 1917) was a French journalist, author and politician, most often remembered for his antisemitic ideology and animus. He initiated the Antisemitic League of France in 1889, and was the founder and editor of the political newspaper La Libre Parole (founded in 1892).

After spending years of research, he synthesised three major types of antisemitism. The first type was traditional Catholic attitudes toward the alien "Christ killers" augmented by vehement antipathy toward the French Revolution. The second type was hostility toward capitalism. The third type was so-called scientific racism, based on the argument that races have fixed characteristics, and asserting that Jews have negative characteristics. His work played a key role in catalyzing the Dreyfus affair.

Drumont's biographer, Grégoire Kauffmann, places Drumont within the counter-revolutionary tradition of Louis Veuillot, Antoine Blanc de Saint-Bonnet, and anti-modern Catholicism. Socialist leader Jean Jaurès stated that "all the ideas and arguments of Drumont were taken from certain clerical opponents of the French Revolution".

== Early life ==
Drumont was born in Paris in 1844 to a family of porcelain painters from Lille. His father died when he was seventeen, and he had to care for himself and earn his own livelihood from then onwards. He attended high school at Lycée Charlemagne.

== Public career ==
He first worked in government service and at one point became a police spy for Napoleon III. Later he became a contributor to the press and was the author of a number of works, of which Mon vieux Paris (1879) was honored by the Académie française. He also worked for Louis Veuillot's L'Univers.

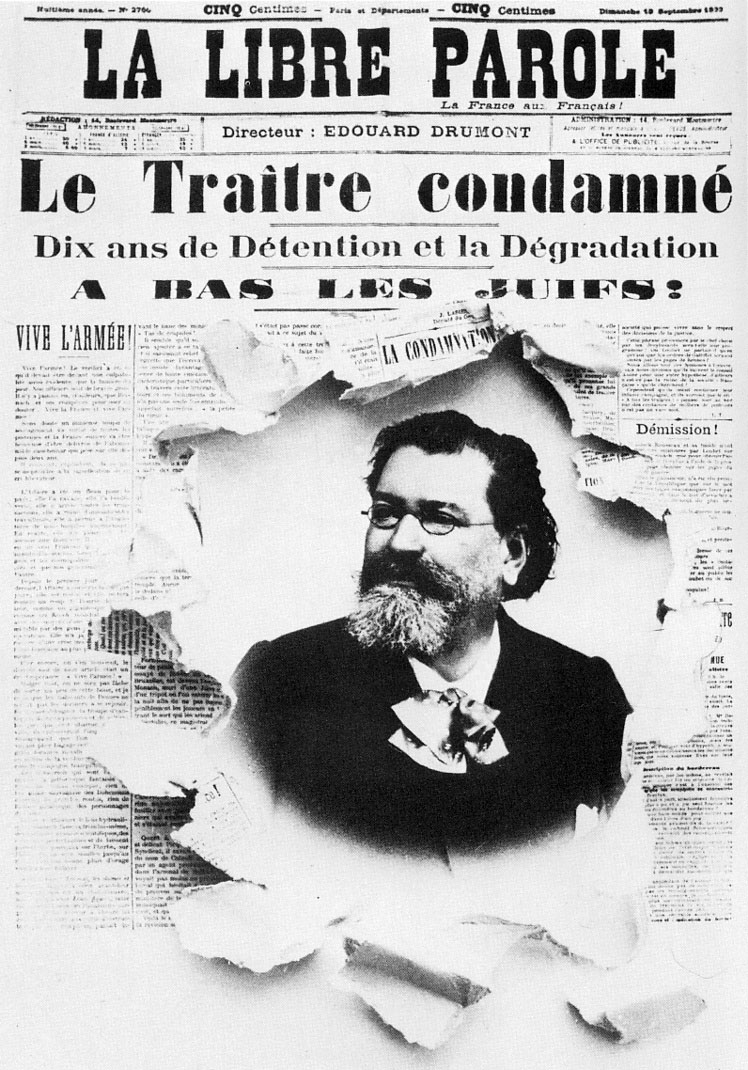
Édouard Drumont, collage with the antisemitic newspaper he founded, La Libre Parole of 10 September 1899. The headlines read: "The Traitor Convicted, Ten Years of Detention and Degradation, Down with the Jews!"

Drumont's 1886 book, La France juive (Jewish France), attacked the role of Jews in France and argued for their exclusion from society. In 1892, Drumont initiated the newspaper the La Libre Parole which became known for intense antisemitism. Gaston Méry was soon made editor in chief due to his skill in exploiting scandalous affairs and his daring invective.

In 1893 he was convicted of defaming Deputy Auguste Burdeau by the Seine Court of Assizes, and sentenced to three months in Sainte-Pélagie Prison (3 November 1892 – 3 February 1893). In prison, he was put in the same area as Pierre Martinet, a founder of individualist anarchism, and Lucien Pemjean, an antisemite and future Nazi collaborator. Upon his release, Drumont invited the anarchists, including Martinet, to a dinner at his home to celebrate his liberation, but they sang the Internationale and other anarchist songs, which displeased him—the two groups nearly came to blows. In 1898, Martinet posted a public notice criticizing Drumont’s conduct during their time in prison; he declared, for instance:

As for me, I can say that there, I saved him from madness. His cell was above mine. Every night, he would knock on my ceiling with the handle of his broom, shouting to me:

— You, whose windows face the street, do you not see Jews coming to burn the jail?

— Rest assured, I replied, I see only the sentinel who watches over us.

The newspaper took "France for the French" as its motto.

The newspaper was skeptical of the anti-Catholic Taxil hoax before Taxil admitted it in 1897. It was the first paper to publish news of Alfred Dreyfus's arrest, in an article titled "High Treason: The Jewish Traitor Alfred Dreyfus Arrested" in 1894.

Initially, Drumont was a supporter of Pope Leo XIII and his policy of ralliement in his encyclical of 1892, Au milieu des sollicitudes which called for French Catholics to embrace the Republic. He soon denounced this course and bitterly insulted the Pope, the Church, and any Catholic who supported it. In one editorial Drumont hoped for a "modern iron-fisted Nogaret for the modern Boniface VIII". In La Libre Parole, Drumont's old friend Count Adrien Albert Marie de Mun and Papal Nuncio Cardinal Domenico Ferrata were denounced like common criminals.

Drumont had many devotees. He exploited the Panama Company scandal and reached the maximum of his notoriety during the Dreyfus Affair, in which he was the most strident accuser of Alfred Dreyfus.

For his anti-Panama articles, Drumont was condemned to three months' imprisonment. In 1893, he was an unsuccessful candidate for Deputy from Amiens; the next year he retired to Brussels. The Dreyfus affair helped him to regain popularity.

For the French legislative election of May 1898, the Anti-Jewish League of Max Régis endorsed Drumont as a candidate for Deputy from the first division of Algiers. Drumont was elected triumphantly with 11,557 votes against 2,328 and 1,741 for his opponents. Of six French Algerian Deputies elected, four were Anti-Jewish League. Drumont represented Algiers in the Chamber of Deputies from 1898 to 1902. He was sued for accusing a Deputy of having accepted a bribe from the wealthy Jewish banker Édouard Alphonse de Rothschild to pass a piece of legislation the banker wanted.

He was defeated for re-election in April–May 1902.

== Works ==
- Mon vieux Paris (1878)
- Les Fêtes nationales à Paris (1878)
- Le Dernier des Trémolin (1879)
- Papiers inédits du Duc de Saint-Simon (1880)
- La Mort de Louis XIV (1880)
- La France juive (Jewish France, 1886)
- La France Juive devant l'opinion (1886)
- La Fin d'un monde : Étude psychologique et sociale (1889)
- La Dernière Bataille (1890)
- Le Testament d'un antisémite (1891)
- Le Secret de Fourmies (1892)
- De l'or, de la boue, du sang : Du Panama à l'anarchie (1896)
- Mon vieux Paris. Deuxième série (1897)
- La Tyrannie maçonnique (1899)
- Les Juifs contre la France (1899)
- Les Tréteaux du succès. Figures de bronze ou statues de neige (1900)
- Les Tréteaux du succès. Les héros et les pitres (1900)
- Le Peuple juif (1900)
- Vieux portraits, vieux cadres (1903)
- Sur le chemin de la vie (1914)

== See also ==
- Panama scandals
- Dreyfus Affair
- Jules Guérin
- Henry Coston

== Sources ==
- Benbassa, Esther (2 July 2001), The Jews of France: A History from Antiquity to the Present, Princeton University Press, ISBN 1-4008-2314-5
- Bouveresse, Jacques (2008), Un parlement colonial: les délégations financières algériennes, 1898-1945 (in French), Publication Univ Rouen Havre, ISBN 978-2-87775-876-5
- Zack, Lizabeth (2005), "Regis, Max (1873-1950)", Antisemitism: A Historical Encyclopedia of Prejudice and Persecution, ABC-CLIO, ISBN 978-1-85109-439-4
