= La France juive =

1886 antisemitic tract by Édouard Drumont

Jewish France
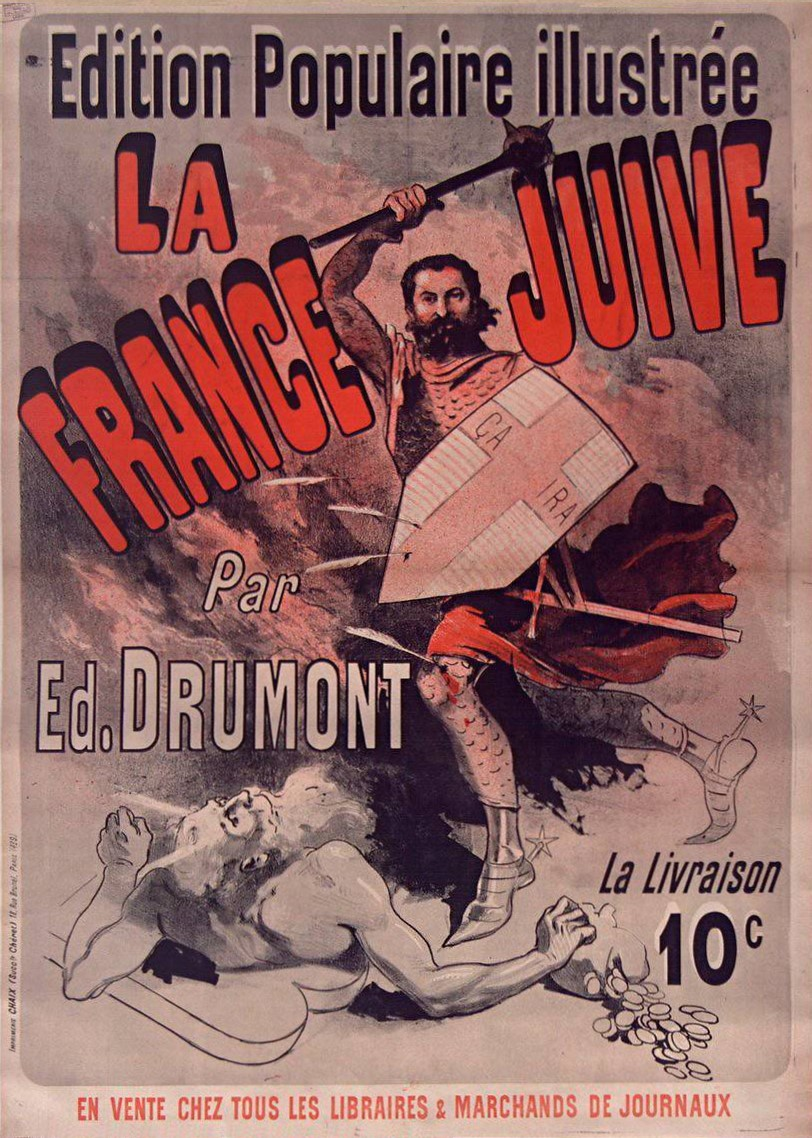
- Poster for the popular illustrated edition by Jules Chéret, 1892
- Author: Édouard Drumont
- Original title: La France juive
- Language: French
- Publisher: Flammarion
- Publication date: 1886
- Publication place: France

La France juive ("Jewish France"), subtitled Essai d'histoire contemporaine ("Essay on Contemporary History"), is a two volume 1,200 page antisemitic tract published by Édouard Drumont in 1886.

== Publication and success ==
A work of 1,200 pages, released in two volumes, it ran to 140 printings during the two years following its initial publication, with 100 reprints in the first year alone. Over the following 25 years 200 editions were printed. In 1888 an abridged version of one volume was published. The book was reissued by the publisher Flammarion in 1938, again in 1941 and 1943, then by Éditions du Trident in 1986. In 2012, it was reissued by the publishing house KontreKulture, run by the nationalist Equality and Reconciliation political group.

La France juive became a major success and achieved great fame. Its success was due in part to the inclusion of a list of names of famous people against whom the author made accusations in the book. Many buyers were inspired by curiosity to see if anyone they knew appeared on the list.

== Themes ==
La France juive developed three strands of antisemitism. One was racial, proposing an opposition between non-Jewish "Aryans" and Jewish "Semites". Another was financial. The author argued that finance and capitalism were controlled by the Jews, even though some notable Jews, like Nissim de Camondo some 30 years after the book had been published, shared their heritage with Parisian citizens. A third was religious, referring to the Jews' supposed complicity in the death of Jesus.

== Context ==
The book appeared in France during a period of turmoil that followed the country's defeat in the Franco-Prussian War of 1870. The years after the war saw a religious crisis, as the Third Republic followed a policy of secularisation. The emergence of economic liberalism during this period led to malaise and social tension. The crash of the Catholic Union General bank occurred in 1882, and Drumont blamed the disaster on the Rothschild family.

== See also ==
- History of the Jews in France
