= Ted Underwood =

American literary and informatics scholar

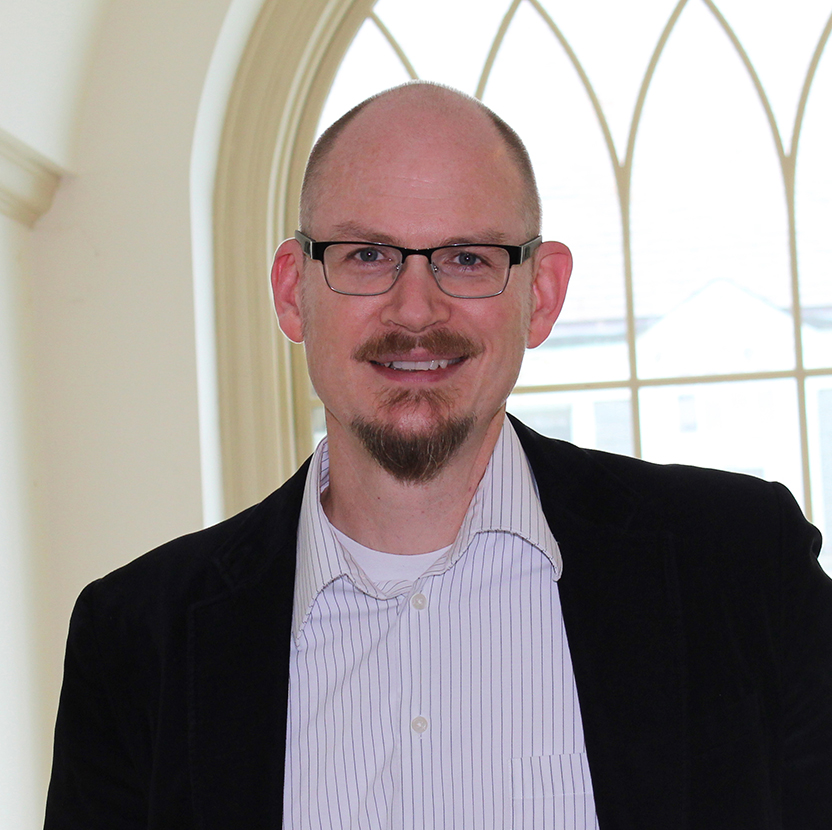
- Ted Underwood, 2016
- Born: 1968 (age 57–58)
- Occupations: Literary scholar, information scientist

Academic background
- Education: M.A. Philosophy Williams College 1989, PhD English Cornell University 1997
- Alma mater: Cornell University

Academic work
- Discipline: Digital humanities, Information science, Literary criticism
- Institutions: University of Rochester, University of Illinois at Urbana–Champaign, Leiden University
- Notable works: The Work of the Sun: Literature, Science, and Political Economy, 1760–1860 (2005), Why Literary Periods Mattered: Historical Contrast and the Prestige of English Studies (2013), Distant horizons : digital evidence and literary change (2019)
- Website: tedunderwood.com

Ted Underwood (born 1968) is an American literary and informatics scholar, using text mining and computational methods, such as machine learning, and statistical modeling with logistic regression for literary criticism on large digital collections of historical literary works such as novels. He is a professor of Information Sciences and English at the University of Illinois Urbana-Champaign (UIUC).

== Biography ==
Underwood obtained a M.A. degree in Philosophy at Williams College, Williamstown, Massachusetts, and a PhD in English at Cornell University, Ithaca, New York, in 1997, where he trained as a Romanticist. He was a visiting assistant professor at the University of Rochester during 1997-1998, and an assistant professor of English from 1998 up to 2006 at Colby College, Waterville, Maine, and at UIUC. There in 2007 he became an associate professor of English and since 2014 full professor of English, and since 2016 also of Information Sciences. He teaches 18th and 19th century British literature in the English Department. At Leiden University, he was a 2019 visiting Scaliger professor.

After publishing on eighteenth and nineteenth English literature using classical literary criticism, Underwood turned to digital humanities for the study of literary patterns, such as genres or gender representation since 1780, by analysing hundreds or thousands of books from digital libraries with computational methods.

== Publications ==
Underwood's publications include:

- Underwood, Ted (1995). "Productivism and the Vogue for 'Energy' in Late Eighteenth-Century Britain". Studies in Romanticism. 34 (1): 103–125. doi:10.2307/25601101. hdl:2142/45678. JSTOR 25601101. "It's safe to conclude, then, that the first law of thermodynamics would not have had the impact it did if the cultural ground hadn't been prepared for it by romanticism. "Productivism" first became a prevalent doctrine in the late eighteenth century, and it did so in a way that left traces in language itself. Of these traces, the redefinition of "energy" and its promotion to the status of a social ideal was probably the most enduring."
- Underwood, Ted (2005). The Work of the Sun: Literature, Science, and Political Economy, 1760–1860. New York: Palgrave Macmillan. ISBN 9781403965998. OCLC 56660049. 240 pages.
- Underwood, Ted (2013). Why Literary Periods Mattered: Historical Contrast and the Prestige of English Studies. Stanford, California: Stanford University Press. ISBN 9780804784467. OCLC 830683628. 199 pages.
- Underwood, Ted (2017). "A Genealogy of Distant Reading". Digital Humanities Quarterly. 11 (2).
- Underwood, Ted (2018). "Why Literary Time is Measured in Minutes". ELH: English Literary History. 85 (2). Johns Hopkins University: 341–365. doi:10.1353/elh.2018.0013. hdl:2142/100076. S2CID 192215143.
- Underwood, Ted (2019). Distant horizons : digital evidence and literary change. Chicago: The University of Chicago Press. ISBN 9780226612669. OCLC 1050140816. 206 pages. Review Porter, J. D. (Fall 2021). "Review: On Not Already Knowing. Reviewed Work(s): Distant Horizons: Digital Evidence and Literary Change by Ted Underwood". Criticism. 63 (4). Wayne State University Press: 445–448. doi:10.13110/criticism.63.4.0445.

== Quote ==
Numbers are becoming more useful in literary study for reasons that are theoretical rather than technical. It is not that computers got faster or disks got bigger but that we have recently graduated from measuring variables to framing models of literary concepts. Since a model defines a relationship between variables, a mode of inquiry founded on models can study relationships rather than isolated facts. Instead of starting with, say, the frequency of connective words, quantitative literary research now starts with social evidence about things that really interest readers of literature — like audience, genre, character, and gender. The literary meaning of those phenomena comes, in a familiar way, from historically grounded interpretive communities. Numbers enter the picture not as an objective foundation for meaning somewhere outside history but as a way to establish comparative relationships between different parts of the historical record.

— Ted Underwood, "Preface", Distant horizons : digital evidence and literary change (2019), pages xi-xii.

== See also ==
- Distant reading
- HathiTrust Digital Library
