= Explication =

Process of drawing out the meaning of something

Explication (German: Explikation) is the process of drawing out the meaning of something that is not clearly defined, so as to make explicit what is currently left implicit. In other words, "to explicate a concept is, roughly, to replace it with a similar but more theoretically useful concept". The term explication is used in both analytic philosophy and literary criticism. German philosopher Rudolf Carnap was the first to coin the term in an analytic philosophical approach in his book Logical Foundations of Probability, while the term is supplanted with Gustave Lanson's idea of Explication de Texte when referring to the analysis and criticism of different forms of literature.

== Carnap's notion of explication ==
=== Summary ===
In analytic philosophy, the concept of explication was first developed by Rudolf Carnap. Explication can be regarded as a scientific process which transforms and replaces "an inexact prescientific concept" (which Carnap calls the explicandum), with a "new exact concept" (which he calls the explicatum). A description and explanation of the nature and impact of the new explicit knowledge is usually called an "explication". The new explicit knowledge draws on, and is an improvement upon, previous knowledge.

=== On explication and truth ===
An explication in the Carnapian sense is purely stipulative, and thus a subclass of normative definitions. Hence, an explication can not be true or false, just more or less suitable for its purpose. (Cf. Rorty's argument about the purpose and value of philosophy in Rorty (2003), "A pragmatist view of contemporary analytic philosophy", in Egginton, W., and Sandbothe, M. (eds), The Pragmatic Turn in Philosophy, SUNY Press, New York, NY.)

Examples of inexact daily life concepts in need of explication are our concepts of cause and of conditionals. Our daily life concept of cause does not distinguish between necessary causes, sufficient causes, complete causes etc. Each of these more precise concepts is an explication of our natural concept of cause.

Natural language will only specify truth conditions for propositions of the form "If p, then q" for situations where "p" is true. (Most of us probably don't have any clear intuitions regarding the truth conditions of the sentence "If I go out in the sun, I will get sunburned" in situations where I never go out in the sun.) An explication of the conditional will also specify truth conditions for situations where "p" is not true.

=== Reviews of Carnap's argument ===
Carnap's argument provides a helpful foundation in understanding and clarifying the nature and value of explication in defining and describing "new" knowledge.

Others' reviews of Carnap's argument offer additional insights about the nature of explication. In particular, Bonolio's paper (2003) "Kant's Explication and Carnap's Explication: The Redde Rationem", and Maher's (2007) "Explication defended", add weight to the argument that explication is an appropriate methodology for formal philosophy.

== Use of the word "explication" ==
The word "explicate" is a verb referring to the process of explicating. The word "explication" is a noun referring to the outcome of that process: the explicative work itself. As conceptual clarity is an important element of analytic philosophy, it is important to use words according to their proper definitions so as to avoid causing unnecessary confusion.

== Semantic explication ==
In the natural semantic metalanguage theory, explications are semantic representations of vocabulary. These explications are made up of a very limited set of words called semantic primes which are considered to have universal meaning across all languages.

An example of an explication of the word happy:

X feels happy = 
     sometimes someone thinks something like this:
          something good happened to something
          I wanted this
          I don't want other things now
     because of this, someone feels something good
     X feels like this

What sets the Natural Semantic Metalanguage Theory's explications apart from previous theories, is that these explications can fit into natural language, even if it sounds very awkward. For example:

The clown looks [happy]

The clown looks like [the clown thinks something like this: 'something good happened to me; I wanted this; I don't want other things now'; because of this, the clown feels something good].

Explications in the Natural Semantic Metalanguage are neither exact dictionary definitions, nor encyclopedic explanations of a concept. They often differ slightly depending upon the personal experiences of the person writing them. In this way, they can be said to "rely heavily on 'folk theories,' that is, the rather naive understandings that most of us have about how life, the universe, and everything work." Explications of abstract concepts, such as color, do not list any scientific facts about the object or concrete definitions. Instead, the explication use comparisons and examples from the real world.

== Explication, explication de texte, and literary criticism ==
The terms explication and explication de texte have different meanings.

As argued by Carnap (1950), in science and philosophy, "explication consists in transforming a given more or less inexact concept into an exact one or, rather, in replacing the first by the second. We call the given concept (or the term used for it) the explicandum, and the exact concept proposed to take the place of the first (or the term proposed for it) the explicatum. The explicandum may belong to everyday language or to a previous stage in the development of scientific language. The explicatum must be given by explicit rules for its use, for example, by a definition which incorporates it into a well-constructed system of scientific either logicomathematical or empirical concepts."

In this context, "explication" is now regarded as "an appropriate methodology for formal philosophy". (Maher, 2007).

By contrast, in literary criticism, the term "explication" is used as a proxy for the term explication de texte (proposed by Gustave Lanson), where additional understandings and meanings are derived from the "close reading" of (say) a poem, novel or play.

In this process, explication often involves a line-by-line or episode-by-episode commentary on what is going on in a text. While initially this might seem reasonably innocuous, explication de texte, and explication per se, is an interpretative process where the resulting new knowledge, new insights or new meanings, are open to subsequent debate and disaffirmation by others.
