= The Bourgeois =

2013 book by Franco Moretti

The Bourgeois: Between History and Literature
- Cover of the first edition
- Author: Franco Moretti
- Language: English
- Subject: Literary criticism
- Publisher: Verso Books
- Publication date: 2013
- Publication place: United States
- Media type: Print
- ISBN: 978-1-78168-304-0

The Bourgeois: Between History and Literature is a 2013 book by literary scholar Franco Moretti. In the book, Moretti examines the concept of the bourgeois as it has developed in European literature.

== Reception ==
Valerie Sanders, writing about The Bourgeois in Times Higher Education, described the book as follows: "Moretti’s purpose, in this short, epigrammatic study of a class that sits awkwardly in the power structure it supposedly influences, is to examine the bourgeois 'refracted through the prism of literature.' His contention, by the end, is that after industrialisation the class bifurcates into two ideal types, 'the good Bürger' and the 'creative destroyer,' irreconcilable in their values."

John Plotz, reviewing The Bourgeois in Victorian Studies, found some weaknesses in Moretti's approach: "This functionalist credo lies at the core of The Bourgeois: Moretti presumes that we can say what a text is by saying what it did to the society on which it was initially unleashed. It is a reading strategy that reveals much but that can also overlook some synchronic interpretive frameworks, and understate the diachronic afterlives of texts that are not totally defined by that site of original production."

However, despite those misgivings, Plotz saw Moretti's book as having immense value, stating that Moretti's "insights become crucial ways of locating important resemblances between novels that share similar strategies despite their surface discrepancies. Taken all in all, there’s no scholar around I’m more eager to read, nobody by whom I’m more provoked and inspired."

Michael Adam Carroll in Romance Quarterly concluded that Moretti's book was an excellent one: "Moretti writes an excellent survey that begins to tie together two centuries of literature and its social influences.... Moretti applies a critical eye to literature, supported by a keen understanding of social critique, answering scholars’ recent call to fill the gap left between humanistic and structuralist approaches."

Stephen E. Roulac, reviewing The Bourgeois in the New York Journal of Books, applauded the book: "Franco Moretti offers a rewarding, thought provoking, mind expanding excursion through evolving social order of recent times. A highly personalized partisan essay, with no encyclopedic ambitions, The Bourgeois is an informed, engaging, entertaining, exploration of how capitalism created and then destroyed the 'middle state' of society."

== Sources ==
- Carroll, Michael Adam (2014). "Review of The Bourgeois: Between History and Literature". Romance Quarterly. 61 (4): 279–280. doi:10.1080/08831157.2014.937234. S2CID 162314771.
- Plotz, John (Summer 2014). "Review of The Bourgeois: Between History and Literature". Victorian Studies. 56 (4). Indiana University Press: 734–736. doi:10.2979/victorianstudies.56.4.734. JSTOR 10.2979/victorianstudies.56.4.734.
- Roulac, Stephen (2013). "Review of The Bourgeois: Between History and Literature". The New York Journal of Books.
- Sanders, Valerie (27 June 2013). "The Bourgeois: Between History and Literature by Franco Moretti: Valerie Sanders relishes this considered study of a quietly worthy class of men". Times Higher Education.
