= Paul Dupuy =

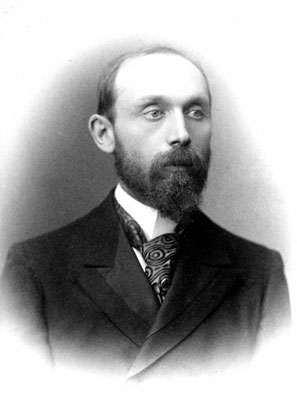
- Paul Dupuy in 1895.
- Born: 18 January 1856; Loudun
- Died: 17 March 1948 (aged 92); Geneva
- Occupations: Historian; Biographer

Paul Dupuy (1856 – 1948), History Lecturer at Paris' École Normale Supérieure, published in 1896 the first scientific biography of the mathematician Évariste Galois, titled "La vie d'Évariste Galois".

He attended the École Normale Supérieure at rue d'Ulm, Paris. His schoolmates included the future geographers Marcel Dubois and Bertrand Auerbach, and the future historians Georges Lacour-Gayet, Salomon Reinach and Gustave Lanson.

In the 1890s, Dupuy was a prominent defender of the unjustly convicted Jewish French officer Alfred Dreyfus.

After his retirement from the École Normale Supérieure, he became one of the first teachers of the International School of Geneva, the world's first international school, which he joined in 1925 at the age of 70, and where he remained for 10 years.

He was the father of Marie-Thérèse Maurette.

== Sources ==
- Ginsburger, Nicolas (2017), "Des îles grecques à la géographie coloniale : Marcel Dubois à la conquête de la Sorbonne (1876-1895)", European Journal of Geography (in French), doi:10.4000/cybergeo.28368
