= Maurette =

Maurette is both a surname and a feminine given name. The surname is of French origin and means 'Moor' or 'Moorish', derived from the Latin word Maurus, and may be a matronymic. Notable people with the name include:

== Surname ==
- Marcelle Maurette (1903–1972), French playwright and screenwriter
- Marie-Thérèse Maurette (1890–1989), French educator
- Victoria Maurette (born 1982), Argentine actress, musician, singer, songwriter, and composer

== Given name ==
- Maurette Brown Clark (born 1966), American gospel musician
