= Georges Lacour-Gayet =

French historian (1856–1935)

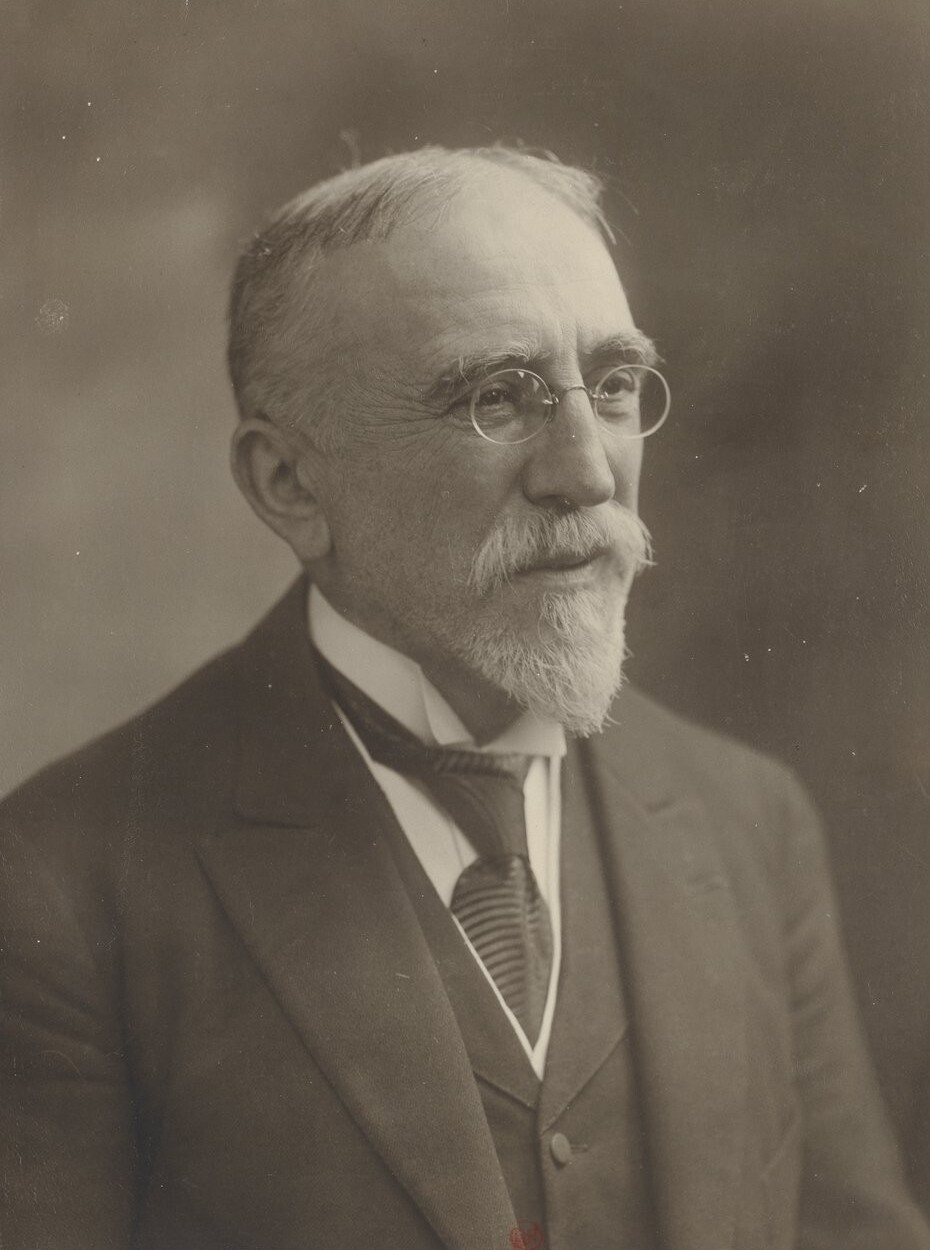
- Lacour-Gayet in c. 1900–1916
- Born: 31 May 1856; Marseille, France
- Died: 8 December 1935 (aged 79); Paris, France
- Occupation: Historian

Georges Lacour-Gayet (31 May 1856 – 8 December 1935) was a French historian who taught at the École Navale and the École Polytechnique. His books on the French navy under Louis XV and Louis XVI are much-quoted and were considered references when published, although they betray his patriotic bias. His master work was a four-volume biography of Talleyrand.

== Life ==
Lacour-Gayet was born in Marseille on 30 May 1856. He attended the École normale supérieure at rue d'Ulm, Paris. His schoolmates included the future geographers Bertrand Auerbach, Marcel Dubois and Paul Dupuy, and the future historians Salomon Reinach and Gustave Lanson. He became a historian. On 2 October 1882, he married Cécile Janet (1856–1926), daughter of the philosopher Paul Janet (1823–1899). Their children were Jacques^{(fr)} (1883–1953), Thérèse (1890–1936) and Robert (1896–1989).

Lacour-Gayet was professor at the École Navale during the period of the Fashoda Incident and the Entente Cordiale. For many years his La marine militaire de la France sous le règne de Louis XV (Paris, Champion, 1902, 571 pages) was considered the reference work for this subject. He gave a course of lectures at the Ecole Superieure de Marine that formed the bases for his 1905 La marine militaire de France sous le règne de Louis XVI. He was also a professor at the École Polytechnique in Paris.

He was a member of the Institut Français, Académie des Sciences Morales et Politiques and the Académie de Marine. He was a member of the Société de l'histoire de France from 1924, and became a member of the society's council that year.

Lacour-Gayet later had another child, a future historian and journalist Georgette Elgey, by his relationship with Madeleine Léon, who belonged to the Jewish upper-class but later converted to Catholicism; she was the great-granddaughter of Michel Lévy, France's first Jewish general. After he refused to marry her, Léon fought for years for Elgey to be officially recognised as his daughter, eventually losing in court but leaving his reputation in tatters. He died in Paris on 8 December 1935 at the age of 79.

== Views ==
Lacour-Gayet described the colonial competition between France and Britain in the century before 1815 as the "Second Hundred Years War". He claimed that the efforts of the Académie de Marine prepared the French navy for its "victories in the American War". This view was not shared by Raoul Castex, who connected the personnel and work of the academy to the naval defeats of the Seven Years' War (1756–63). Lacour-Gayet considered that "Suffren, among the grand sailors, is the perfect model." He had "the spirit of initiative ... the premier quality of a commander, the most necessary, the most truly characteristic, because it is for this that he is chief."

Writing of the year 1758, he wrote in La marine militaire de France sous le règne de Louis XVI (1905), "To the repeated descents of the English on coasts of the Saintonge, the Contentin, and Brittany, had been added the loss of Louisbourg, which portended that of Montreal. ... The course of events led one to the idea of a landing in the British islands; because it was the true means to revenge ourselves with a single stroke, and to finish the war." Lacour-Gayet was hard on failure. Charles François Emmanuel Nadeau du Treil^{(fr)}, the governor of Guadeloupe, was degraded and condemned to life imprisonment after he lost the island in 1759. Lacour-Gayet said he deserved the punishment.

Lacour-Gayet's 1905 book on the navy under Louis XVI was written at a time when the loss at Fashoda was still remembered with bitterness and many in France were hostile to England. He saw the failure of France to invade Britain when they had the chance in 1779 as a great lost opportunity. The French fleet dominated the English channel and the French army of invasion was ready to embark in transports. He wrote, "Never at any time in history, not even when Napoleon's army lay encamped at Boulogne, was the French navy to near its oft-dreamt-of goal, the invasion of England."

In 1918, Nicolae Petrescu-Comnen contributed an ethnographic overview of Dobruja (La Dobrogea), just as the region was being absorbed into a Greater Bulgaria. Lacour-Gayet presented the work at the Romanian Academy and said the "savant work" of "truth and justice", had exposed the practices of Bulgarisation.

Lacour-Gayet's biography of Talleyrand (4 volumes, 1928–1934) was exhaustively documented. He studied all of Talleyrand's writings and concluded "the mechanism of the constitution, which had been functioning only a few years, the role of the President, the programs of different parties did not seem to have fixed his attention." He noted that Talleyrand's observations focused primarily on economics rather than politics, so he could not be called a direct predecessor of Alexis de Tocqueville.

== Publications ==
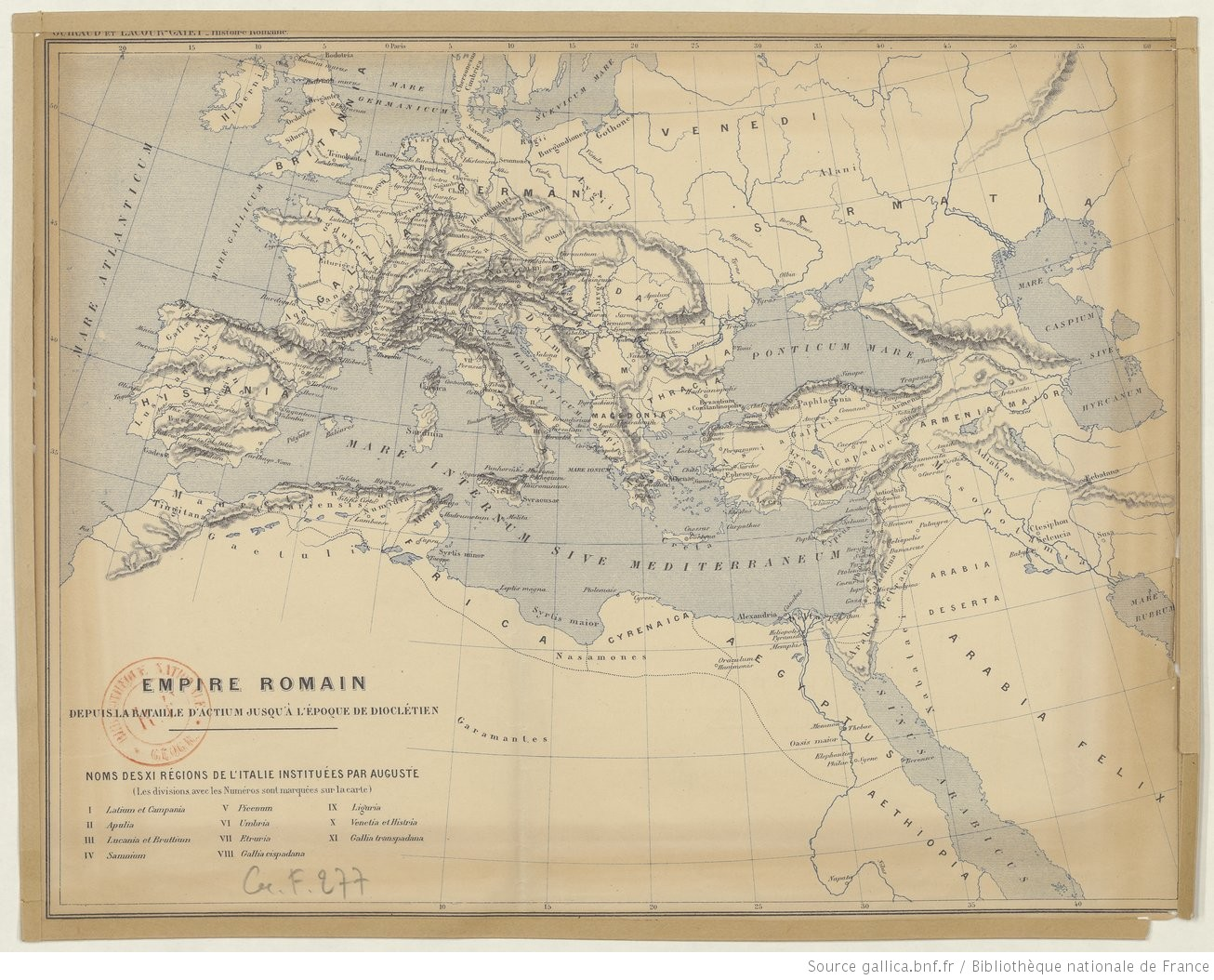
Roman Empire from the Battle of Actium to the era of Diocletian by Paul Guiraud and Georges Lacour-Gayet, published by Erhard, Paris

The Bibliothèque nationale de France records 222 published documents by Lacour-Gayet. Documents provided in digitized format on the Gallica website are:

- Georges Lacour-Gayet (1888), Antonin le Pieux et son temps (essai sur l'histoire de l'Empire romain au milieu du IIe siècle, 138–161, thèse présentée à la Faculté des lettres de Paris), Paris: E. Thorin, p. 499
- Georges Lacour-Gayet (1892), Lectures historiques, rédigées conformément aux programmes de l'enseignement secondaire pour la classe de rhétorique. Histoire des temps modernes, 1610–1789, Paris: Hachette, p. 600
- Georges Lacour-Gayet (1898–1899), Histoire maritime de la France. Troisième partie. La marine française pendant le règne de Louis XIV, Paris: Imprimerie nationale, p. 156
- Georges Lacour-Gayet (1905), La marine militaire de France sous le règne de Louis XVI, Paris: H. Champion, p. 719
- Georges Lacour-Gayet (1910), La marine militaire de la France sous le règne de Louis XV (2 ed.), Paris: H. Champion, p. 581
- Georges Lacour-Gayet (1911), La marine militaire de la France sous les règnes de Louis XIII et de Louis XIV Tome 1 : Richelieu, Mazarin, 1624–1661, Paris: H. Champion, p. 268
- Georges Lacour-Gayet (1911), La guerre de 1870 (Conférences faites à la section historique du "Foyer" en 1911), précédées d'une allocution prononcée par M. Henry Welschinger, Paris: édition du "Foyer", p. 96
- Georges Lacour-Gayet (1914), Les Journées de Barfleur et de La Hougue, 29 mai-3 juin 1692, Paris: Impr. de Firmin-Dido / Institut de France, p. 15
- Georges Lacour-Gayet (1915), Un épisode de la guerre navale. La défense de Papeete (22 septembre 1914) (Edition spéciale de la "Revue hebdomadaire"), Paris: Impr. de Plon-Nourrit et Cie, p. 15
- Georges Lacour-Gayet (1916), Les premières relations de Talleyrand et de Bonaparte, décembre 1797-janvier 1798 (lecture faite à la séance de rentrée de la Société des études historiques, le 23 novembre 1916), Paris: Librairie Alphonse Picard et fils, p. 23
- Georges Lacour-Gayet (1918), Bismarck, Paris: Hachette, p. 248
- Georges Lacour-Gayet (1921), Napoléon et l'empire de la mer : l'occupation des îles ioniennes (Défet de "La Revue de la semaine", n° du 22 avril 1921), Paris: La Revue de la semaine, pp. 392–409
- Georges Lacour-Gayet (1922), Bonaparte, membre de l'Institut de la République Cisalpine (Extrait de la "Revue mondiale", n° du 15 février 1922), pp. 396–403
- Georges Lacour-Gayet (1922), Napoléon à Fontainebleau en 1814 (Extrait de la "Revue des Etudes napoléoniennes", juillet-août 1922), pp. 41–60
- Georges Lacour-Gayet (1922), Bonaparte membre de l'Institut de la République cisalpine (Extrait des "Séances et travaux de l'Académie des sciences morales et politiques". – Nov.-déc. 1922), pp. 321–330
- Georges Lacour-Gayet (1922), Un prédécesseur de Pie XI : le pape Pie VII à Paris (Extrait de la "Revue des Jeunes", n° du 25 février 1922), pp. 393–406
- Georges Lacour-Gayet (1923), Napoléon et l'empire de la mer : la traversée de la Méditerranée en 1798 (Défêt de la "Revue des études napoléoniennes", janvier février 1923), pp. 5–27
- Georges Lacour-Gayet (1923), L'éducation politique de Louis XIV (2 ed.), Paris: Hachette
- Georges Lacour-Gayet (1924), Saint-Germain des Prés et la Coupole, Paris: Hachette, impr., p. 69
- Georges Lacour-Gayet (1925), L'Impératrice Eugénie, Paris: éditions Albert Morancé; Libr. centrale d'art et d'architecture, p. 104
- Georges Lacour-Gayet (1927), Une page inédite de l'histoire des Etats du Languedoc en 1750, d'après les archives de la famille des Monstiers de Mérinville (Extrait des "Séances et travaux de l'Académie des sciences morales et politiques". Numéro de janvier-février 1927), Evreux/Paris: Impr. Ch. Hérissey / libr. Félix Alcan, p. 18
- Georges Lacour-Gayet (1928–1934), Talleyrand 1754–1838, vol. 1–4, Paris: Payot
- Georges Lacour-Gayet (1935), Le château de Saint-Germain-en-Laye, Paris: Calman-Lévy, p. 214

== Sources ==
- Catinchi, Philippe-Jean (June 2017), "Georgette Elgey : Au nom du père", L'Histoire (in French)
- Devarrieux, Claire (14 June 2017), "Georgette Elgey, retour aux origines", Libération (in French)
- Dziembowski, Edmond (October–December 2006), "Reviewed Work: The French Navy and the Seven Years' War by Jonathan R. Dull", Annales historiques de la Révolution française (in French), 346, LES HÉRITAGES RÉPUBLICAINS SOUS LE CONSULAT ET L'EMPIRE, Armand Colin, JSTOR 41889392
- Garric, Alain, "Georges LACOUR Lacour-Gayet", geneanet (in French)
- Georges Lacour-Gayet (1856–1935) (in French), BnF: Bibliothèque nationale de France
- Ginsburger, Nicolas (2017), "Des îles grecques à la géographie coloniale : Marcel Dubois à la conquête de la Sorbonne (1876–1895)", European Journal of Geography (in French), doi:10.4000/cybergeo.28368
- Greenbaum, Louis S. (May 1969), "Reviewed Work: Talleyrand by Duff Cooper", The French Review, 42 (6), American Association of Teachers of French, JSTOR 385481
- Lacour-Gayet, Georges (1918), "Rapports verbaux et communications diverses. La Dobrogea (Dobroudja), de M. N. P. Comnène", Séances et Travaux de l'Académie des Sciences Morales. Comptes Rendus (in French), 78 (7)
- Lesueur, Boris (2015-01-01), Les troupes coloniales d'Ancien Régime: Fidelitate per Mare et Terras – Kronos N° 82 (in French), SPM, ISBN 978-2-336-36549-7
- Palmer, Michael A. (30 June 2009), Command at Sea: Naval Command and Control since the Sixteenth Century, Harvard University Press, ISBN 978-0-674-04191-2
- Patterson, Alfred Temple (1960), The Other Armada, Manchester University Press, GGKEY:PCH3UPNUKAW
- "Procès-verbal de la Séance du Conseil D'administration de la Société de l'histoire de France: Tenue le 7 janvier 1936", Annuaire-Bulletin de la Société de l'histoire de France (in French), 73 (1), Editions de Boccard on behalf of the Societe de l'Histoire de France: 53–55, 1936–1937, JSTOR 23405524
- Smelser, Marshall (1 December 2012), The Campaign for the Sugar Islands, 1759: A Study of Amphibious Warfare, UNC Press Books, ISBN 978-0-8078-3846-4
- Sonn, Richard D. (1 January 2010), Sex, Violence, and the Avant-Garde: Anarchism in Interwar France, Penn State Press, ISBN 978-0-271-03664-9
