= The Emotions of London =

Digital Humanities project

The Emotions of London is a digital humanities project that explores the relationship between geographic spaces in London and their emotional portrayal in English-language fiction from the 18th and 19th centuries. Led by Ryan Heuser, Franco Moretti, and Erik Steiner, the project investigates how digital tools can map the geographical and emotional representations of London in fiction. The central question the project explores is how place names and settings in English fiction are emotionally charged and how these emotional portrayals relate to London’s evolving urban and social landscapes. The project uses crowdsourcing techniques and Geographic Information Systems (GIS) to explore how fiction is emotionally invested in London's iconic locations.

== Project Methodology ==
The project was devised through a combination of computational and manual techniques to extract and analyze data from a corpus of 4,862 digitized novels originally published between 1700 and 1900. To identify London place-name occurrences within the chosen texts, named-entity recognition (NER) software, supplemented with traditional historical research to account for the historical and spatial specificity of London places, was used. Of the 382 locations identified by the NER software, a list of 161 frequently mentioned places in London was compiled for investigation, capturing a wide spatial range of the city including areas like the West End and the suburb of Richmond.

Once the place names were chosen, the one hundred words before and after the word (culminating in a 200-word passage) were read and tagged with a corresponding emotion. Due to experiment and cost-based restrictions, the only emotions the taggers were able to associate with a passage were happiness and fear, which were chosen to represent the two extreme poles of the emotional spectrum that encompass positive and negative associations with space. Crowdsourcing through Amazon Mechanical Turk was employed to annotate these place-name mentions, focusing on two key aspects: (1) whether the text’s passage is set in the mentioned place, and (2) whether a specific emotion (happiness or fear) is associated with the place. Each passage was annotated by 20 participants and the emotional association would only be accepted if more than half of respondents agreed. These results were also separately compared to those of a test group of PhD students, which resulted in a consensus rate of 70%.

== Key Findings ==
=== Geographic Growth and Emotional Stuckness ===
The project reveals a strong geographic and emotional polarity between different areas of fictionalized London in novels between 1700-1900. The fictional depictions point to a concentration of place mentions in central and West London, such as the City Center and the West End, while other regions remained underrepresented. Despite London’s rapid expansion from a population of 600,000 to more than 4.5 million and a diminishing residential population in the City and West End throughout this period, these areas dominated fictional attention and suggests a narrative 'stuckness' in the representation of certain iconic spaces, such as St. Paul's Cathedral, Guildhall, and Newgate. For example, the West End and peripheral suburban areas like Hampstead are generally associated with happiness, while the City and East End are more often associated with fear. This pattern reflects the historical divide between affluent, aristocratic spaces and areas associated with poverty, crime, and punishment. This emotional stuckness suggests that literature retains a historical view of London’s geography, often reinforcing earlier configurations of social and spatial organization rather than adapting to the city’s dynamic growth.

=== Fear and Happiness in Fictional London ===
The project’s analysis of fear and happiness in fiction reveals that fear is predominantly linked with places tied to punishment, death, violence, and social disgrace. Locations like prisons, courts, and markets in the City (e.g., Fleet Prison, Newgate, and Smithfield) consistently evoke fear in fictional portrayals. By contrast, happiness is closely associated with spaces of social interaction, including parks, squares, theatres, and churches (e.g., Hyde Park, Grosvenor Square, Covent Garden, and St. Paul’s Cathedral). These places, many of which are located in the West End, facilitate positive social experiences such as friendship, romance, and high-society gatherings. In the fiction from this project’s corpus, happiness is predominantly portrayed as a product of social and communal experiences, while fear often arises from individual encounters with the darker aspects of urban life.

=== Emotional Polarity and Neutrality ===
Although researching the presence of emotion, The Emotions of London project concluded that 84% of annotated passages were considered neutral, rather than being tagged as happy or fearful. This may be in part because of the correlation between narrative setting and emotionality; tagged passages that were depicting a narrative setting were more than two times likelier to convey emotionality rather than neutrality. However, it is also important to note, as the researchers do themselves, that the project seeks to map the emotionality of public spaces rather than private, which may impact the perception of fictional London’s emotional neutrality between 1700-1900.

=== Crowdsourcing and Emotional Annotations ===
The crowdsourcing component of the project produced high rates of agreement among participants, with an average consensus of 70% across annotations when compared with a control group. This suggests that non-expert readers can effectively annotate literary texts for emotional content and produce data that aligns with expert interpretations, despite the for-profit nature of crowdsourcing platforms like Amazon Mechanical Turk. Crowdsourcing enabled the researchers to scale their analysis across thousands of texts to provide a more comprehensive picture of how fictional London places were emotionally charged in eighteenth and nineteenth century English fiction.
