= Bertrand Auerbach =

French historian

- Born: 2 September 1856; Paris
- Died: 25 August 1942 (aged 85)
- Occupations: Explorer, geographer

Bertrand Auerbach (2 September 1856 – 25 August 1942) was a French explorer, anthropologist and geographer. He published several works on Austria-Hungary, which had a complex mix of ethnic groups and languages in the period before World War I (1914–18).

== Life ==
Bertrand Auerbach was born on 2 September 1856 in Paris, son of Sigismond Auerbach and Julie Borach. He attended the École normale supérieure at rue d'Ulm, Paris. His schoolmates included the future geographers Marcel Dubois and Paul Dupuy, and the future historians Georges Lacour-Gayet, Salomon Reinach and Gustave Lanson. As a student he was known for his gift in languages, with excellent German, good English and Greek, and a knowledge of Hebrew. He was interested in history at first, and his study of geography under Ernest Desjardins only concerned historical geography. He was taught by Paul Vidal de La Blache (1845–1918) who prepared the 3rd year students for their agrégation in history and geography. He does not seem to have been exposed to the teachings of Vidal de la Blache before then. He received his agrégation in history and geography in 1880.

Auerbach taught in secondary schools in Bourges, Laval, Belfort, Toulouse and then Lyon. In 1881 he applied for a travel grant and in 1882 asked to be allowed to study for a doctorate. In 1883 he was appointed lecturer in Ancient History at Caen, and in 1885 was funded to travel in Germany, where he studied the archives of Dresden. Auerbach taught at the Faculty of Arts of the University of Nancy from 1885 to 1926. In 1885 he was granted his master's degree in history and geography. At Nancy he became increasingly interested in geography, and his last historical work appeared in 1889.

In his 1887 thesis, La diplomatie française et la Cour de Saxe, 1648-1680, Auerbach described the conflicts between Prince Johann Georg's position as a key support of the "true religion" (Lutheranism) and his employment of Italians and Frenchmen, and construction of a theater and a "miniature Sistine chapel." Auerbach married Adèle Alice Hirsch (1866–1946) on 21 March 1888 in Paris. From January 1893 Auerbach was one of the first professors of geography in France. The Annales de Géographie was founded by Vidal de La Blache in 1891. For three decades Auerbach was part of the group associated with the Annales de Géographie. He published an article in the second volume, and submitted an article each year until 1907 under the headings of Alsace-Lorraine and Germany. He wrote about 600 reports, including about 50 on Alsace-Lorraine, with his last contribution in 1922.

In 1898 Auerbach published a lengthy study of the races and nationalities of Austria-Hungary. His book tried to define the "national spirit" of the peoples of Austria Hungary. He noted that Italian-speakers dominated the province of Trieste while the Slovenes were peasants who lived in the mountainous areas, but that did not show that the province should naturally belong to Italy. He stated that Austrian ethnographers had shown "everyday language did not match the mother language, and race did not match nationality." He concluded that conventional definitions of race and nationality were imprecise, did not help disentangle the complex identities in the region, and were not useful in confirming the political claims of groups of nationalists.

In the fall of 1910 Auerbachs's carefully prepared instructions to France's envoys to the imperial German diet at Ratisbon were the subject of heated discussions.

== Publications ==
Auerbach's publications included:

- Bertrand Auerbach (1887), La diplomatie française et la Cour de Saxe, 1648-1680 (Thesis), Paris: Hachette
- Bertrand Auerbach (1887), Quid sibi voluerit Strabo, rerum geographicarum libros componendo, the-sim proponebat Facultati litterarum parisiensi B. Auerbach,..., Nanceii: ex prelis typographiae novae
- Bertrand Auerbach (1893), Le Plateau lorrain, essai de géographie régionale..., Paris & Nancy: Berger-Levrault
- Bertrand Auerbach (1898), Les Races et les nationalités en Autriche-Hongrie, Paris: F. Alcan
- Henry Joly (1911), Géographie physique de la Lorraine et de ses enveloppes, preface by B. Auerbach, Nancy: A. Barbier
- Bertrand Auerbach (1912), La France et le saint Empire Romain germanique depuis la paix de Westphalie jusqu'à la Révolution française, Paris: H. Champion
- Bertrand Auerbach (1917), Les Races et les nationalités en Autriche-Hongrie, par Bertrand Auerbach, Contains an article by Marius Leblond on the work (2 ed.), Paris: F. Alcan
- Bertrand Auerbach (1917), Les Ruthènes, Librairie Félix Alcan
- Bertrand Auerbach (1923), La Dictature du prolétariat en Hongrie, 22 mars-31 juillet 1919, Paris: E. Chiron
- Albert Collignon (1924), Albert Collignon. Reliquiae, preface by B. Auerbach, Nancy: Berger-Levrault
- Bertrand Auerbach (1925), L'Autriche et la Hongrie pendant la guerre, depuis le début des hostilités jusqu'à la chute de la monarchie, août 1914-novembre 1918, Paris: Félix Alcan
- Bertrand Auerbach (1927), Le Rattachement de l'Autriche à l'Allemagne, Nancy-Paris-Strasbourg: Berger-Levrault
- Bertrand Auerbach; Pierre Deffontaines (1949), Champagne-Ardenne, vallée de la Meuse, Aperçu géographique., Paris: Hachette
- Bertrand Auerbach; Pierre Deffontaines (1950), Vosges, Lorraine, Alsace, preface by Francis Ambrière, Paris: Hachette
- Wilson, Keith (1996-11-30), Forging the Collective Memory: Government and International Historians through Two World Wars, Berghahn Books, ISBN 978-1-78238-828-9

== Sources ==
- "Annales de Géographie", JSTOR
- Bertrand Auerbach (1856-1942) (in French), BnF: Bibliotheque nationale de France
- Frandsen, Mary E. (2006-04-27), Crossing Confessional Boundaries: The Patronage of Italian Sacred Music in Seventeenth-Century Dresden, Oxford University Press, ISBN 978-0-19-534636-7
- Ginsburger, Nicolas (2017), "Des îles grecques à la géographie coloniale : Marcel Dubois à la conquête de la Sorbonne (1876-1895)", European Journal of Geography (in French), doi:10.4000/cybergeo.28368
- Leveque, Jean Christophe, "Bertrand AUERBACH", geneanet (in French)
- Robic, Marie-Claire (1999), "Bertrand Auerbach (1856-1942), Éclaireur et " sans grade " de l'École française de géographie", Revue Géographique de l'Est (in French), 39 (1), doi:10.4000/rge.4538
- Sluga, Glenda (2001-01-11), The Problem of Trieste and the Italo-Yugoslav Border: Difference, Identity, and Sovereignty in Twentieth-Century Europe, SUNY Press, ISBN 978-0-7914-4823-6
- Vejdani, Farzin (2014-11-05), Making History in Iran: Education, Nationalism, and Print Culture, Stanford University Press, ISBN 978-0-8047-9281-3
