= Explication de Texte =

French formalist method of literary analysis

Explication de Texte is a French formalist method of literary analysis that allows for limited reader response, similar to close reading in the English-speaking literary tradition. The method involves a detailed yet relatively objective examination of structure, style, imagery, and other aspects of a work. It was particularly advocated by Gustave Lanson.

It is primarily a pedagogical tool, similar to a formal book report.

A simple format for writing an Explication de Texte is this:

1. A brief summary of the literal, not the figurative, content;
2. A description of the text's type and structure (e.g. Was it a sonnet? What kind?) and its tone;
3. The poetic devices used in the text (e.g. personification)
4. Conclusion

== See also ==
- Book report
- Close reading
- Explication
