= Robert Lacour-Gayet =

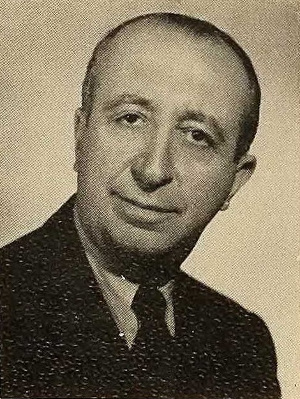
- Born: 22 July 1896; Paris, France
- Died: 2 March 1989 (aged 92); Paris, France
- Occupation: Historian
- Writing career
- Period: 1923 - 1986
- Subjects: French History, American History, Economic History

Robert Lacour-Gayet (22 July 1896 – 2 March 1989) was a French banking official, historian, author and educator who taught in the United States after World War II.

== Life and career ==
Lacour-Gayet came from a family of intellectuals, teachers and historians. His maternal grandfather was Paul Janet, a French philosopher. His father, Georges Lacour-Gayet, was a historian who published a famous biography of Talleyrand. His brother, Jacques Lacour-Gayet, was an economic historian with whom he frequently collaborated. His half-sister, Georgette Elgey, also became a historian.

He served as an artillery officer during World War I, for which he received the Croix de Guerre. Lacour-Gayet studied at the Lycee Louis-le-Grand, l'Ecole des sciences Politiques, and at the University of Paris, from which he held both a Master's and Doctorate in Law, as well as a Doctorate in Economic Science. In 1921, Lacour-Gayet was admitted to the Council of the Inspectorate General of Finance in France, and was subsequently named Financial Representative of France in the United States (1924-1930), where he played an important role in the negotiation of the Mellon–Berenger Agreement concerning France's debt to the United States. He then became Director of the Economic Department for the Bank of France in 1930, before being named Chief of the Office of Inspectors General of Finance in 1939, a position he held until 1945. He was given the title of Inspecteur général honoraire des Finances.

Lacour-Gayet began his teaching career in the United States in 1945 as a Lecturer in Administrative Law at The Fletcher School of Law and Diplomacy. He began teaching at St. John's University in 1946, and was appointed Associate Professor and Chairman of the Department of History and Government in 1950. Lacour-Gayet was promoted to Professor in 1954, and remained at St. John's until 1957, when he became Professor Emeritus. He frequently taught evening classes at New York University, and during Summers at the Universite Laval. He became president of the Société des Professeurs Français en Amérique in 1953. Lacour-Gayet returned to Paris in 1957 to teach American history and literature at the Catholic Institute of Paris. He was honored in 1966 with the Homme de Lettres from la fédération des Alliances Françaises aux Etats-Unis. The St. John's History Department dedicated the Spring 1957 issue of its journal, Past and Present: A Journal of History and Government, to Lacour-Gayet "in appreciation for a decade of service and inspiration to thousands of students at St. John's University." St. John's awarded him an Honorary Doctor of Letters on 23 March 1964.

Beginning in the 1920s, Lacour-Gayet was a regular contributor to Revue des deux mondes, Revue de Paris, Revue d'histoire diplomatique and L'Actualité économique, among other publications. In the United States, he contributed articles to the Proceedings of the Academy of Political Science in the City of New York and the American Journal of Economics and Sociology, as well as book reviews to the Catholic Historical Review. He was the author, co-author, or editor of nineteen books, ranging from economic histories of France to popular histories of Canada, South Africa, Australia and the United States.

== Bibliography ==
Books by Robert Lacour-Gayet:

- Les Grandes Crises de l'Histoire de France (1945).
- (with Jacques Lacour-Gayet) De Platon à la Terreur (1948).
- (with Jacques Lacour-Gayet) Monnaie d'hier et de demain (1956).
- (with Jacques Lacour-Gayet) Vingt ans de capitalisme d'Etat (1956).
- La Vie quotidienne aux États-Unis à la veille de la guerre de Sécession, 1830-1860 (1957).
  - English edition: Everyday Life in the United States Before the Civil War, 1830-1860 (1969).
- Les Renaissances financières de la France de Saint-Louis à Poincaré (1959).
- Introduction and notes to Mémoires du comte Beugnot (1779-1815) (1959).
- Introduction and notes to Mémoires du général baron Thiebault (1772-1820) (1962).
- Calonne: financier, réformateur, contre-révolutionnaire, 1734-1802 (1963).
- Introduction and notes to Souvenirs du Chancelier Pasquier (1767-1815) (1964).
  - English edition: The Memoirs of Chancellor Pasquier, 1767-1815 (1967).
- Histoire du Canada (1966; 2nd ed., 1979).
- Introduction and notes to Mémoires du général baron de Marbot (1799-1815) (1966).
- Histoire de l'Afrique du Sud (1970).
  - English edition: A History of South Africa (1977).
- Histoire de l'Australie (1973).
  - English edition: A Concise History of Australia (1976).
- Histoire des États-Unis, 4 volumes:
  - I: Des origines à la fin de la guerre civile (1976).
  - II: De la fin de la guerre civile à Pearl Harbor (1977).
  - III: De Pearl Harbor à Kennedy (1979).
  - IV: De Kennedy à Reagan (1982).
- Americaines insolites (1986).

A bibliography of the many articles published by Lacour-Gayet during his decade at St. John's is included in the St. John's University publication, Staff Writings 1947-1957.
