= Professing Criticism =

- Author: John Guillory
- Language: English
- Genre: Nonfiction
- Publication date: 2022
- Pages: 456

Professing Criticism: Essays on the Organization of Literary Study is a widely reviewed 2022 nonfiction book written by literary scholar John Guillory.

In response to a review by Bruce Robbins (academic), Guillory asked “how we justify what we do. Does this justification necessarily entail a claim to political efficacy? . . .” From Guillory's perspective, “[t]he conflation of professional literary study with the criticism of society has aggravated to an insupportable degree the tendency of scholars to overestimate their social impact, and to assert the political efficacy of their work where it is perhaps least to be found. . . . At the least, we professors might come up with a better way of talking about the profession of studying literature, and a better way to promote intelligent reading as an indispensable practice of an educated citizenry. Is the cultivation of the craft of reading not something we know how to do, if only we could acknowledge it as our vocation? Is there not a political task here to which we can point, without undue self-congratulation?”
