= John Guillory =

Literature professor and academic

John David Guillory
- Born: John David Guillory; 1952 (age 73–74); United States
- Occupations: Literary critic, author

John David Guillory (born 1952) is an American literary critic and academic. He is the Julius Silver Emeritus Professor of English at New York University.

== Life ==
Guillory "grew up in New Orleans in a working-class Catholic family, and attended Jesuit schools". He graduated Phi Beta Kappa from Tulane University in 1974, and earned a PhD in English from Yale University in 1979. His doctoral thesis, "Poetry and Authority: Spenser, Milton, and Literary History", was subsequently revised as his first monograph. Guillory taught at Yale University (1979–89), Johns Hopkins University (1989–97), and Harvard University (1997–99) before moving to New York University in 1999. He has served on the Executive Committee of the Folger Shakespeare Library; on the Supervisory Board of the English Institute; on the Editorial Board of the journals Profession and English Literary History; and on the Executive Council, the Prize Committee for First Book Publication, the Committee on Professional Employment, and the Committee on the Bibliography of the Teaching of Literature for the Modern Language Association.

Guillory's book Cultural Capital: The Problem of Literary Canon Formation (1993) argued that "the category of 'literature' names the cultural capital of the old bourgeoisie, a form of capital increasingly marginal to the social function of the present educational system". After an opening chapter on the debate over the literary canon, Cultural Capital took up several 'case studies': Thomas Gray's Elegy Written in a Country Churchyard, the close reading of New Criticism, and literary theory after Paul De Man. Guillory viewed the rigour of 'Theory' as an attempt by literary scholars to reclaim its cultural capital from a newly ascendant technical professional class. Its unconscious aim was "to model the intellectual work of the theorist on the new social form of intellectual work, the technobureaucratic labour of the new professional-managerial class", "as Barbara and John Ehrenreich termed it". While the title phrase "cultural capital" invokes the sociology of Pierre Bourdieu, Guillory has said that "The book that I'm always trying to point people toward is Alvin Gouldner's work The Future of Intellectuals and the Rise of the New Class. That's where I originally started to think about the issue of the professional managerial class and the possibility of thinking about literary study in the context of the sociology of professions." A final chapter gave a history of the concept of value from Adam Smith to Barbara Herrnstein Smith.

Guillory's Professing Criticism: Essays on the Organization of Literary Study (2022) was an "attempt to disabuse literary scholars, literary professionals, from the idealizations that we cling to so strongly and don't want to give up". Critic Stefan Collini called the volume "the most penetrating, and in some ways most original, study we have of the forces that have shaped the history of literary study, especially in the US".

In December 2024, Guillory delivered the keynote address at The Leibniz Center for Literary and Cultural Research (ZfL) on "Scholarship, Activism, and the Autonomy of Social Spheres", described as "an attempt to clarify a longstanding controversy in the history of humanities scholarship in the university, namely its relation to political activism, and to the political in general".

In May 2025, Guillory gave the British Academy Lecture at Queen's University Belfast, titled: "'It's not what you know, it's who you know': The Problem of Social Capital", applying "Bourdieu's theory to an analysis of F. Scott Fitzgerald's novel The Great Gatsby (1925), with the aim of establishing the relation between cultural capital and social capital as two forms of 'knowing.' This relation correlates Gatsby's desire for social capital, which he uses to pursue Daisy Buchanan, as part of Fitzgerald's bid for the text's canonical status as a 'great' American novel."

Guillory is currently writing a book entitled Freedom of Thought: Philosophy and Literature in the English Renaissance.

== Awards and honors ==
1992: Best American Essays for "Canon, Syllabus, List"

1994: René Wellek Prize from the American Comparative Literature Association for Cultural Capital, "an uncompromising study of the problem of canon formation itself and what that problem tells us about the crisis in contemporary education"

1997: Class of 1932 Fellow of the Council of the Humanities, Princeton University

2001: Tanner Lectures on Human Values at UC Berkeley, respondent to Sir Frank Kermode

2016: Francis Andrew March Award] from the Association of Departments of English for "Distinguished Service to the Profession of English Studies"

2016: Golden Dozen Award for teaching, New York University

2024: Wilbur Cross Medal "for exceptional scholarship, teaching, and public service", Yale Graduate School of Arts and Sciences (GSAS)

== Books ==
- Poetic Authority: Spenser, Milton, and Literary History. Columbia University Press, 1983.
- Cultural Capital: The Problem of Literary Canon Formation. University of Chicago Press, 1993. Special issue of Genre, "Thirty Years after John Guillory's Cultural Capital" (April 2023), co-edited by Merve Emre and Justin Sider.
- (ed. with Judith Butler and Kendall Thomas) What's Left of Theory?: New Work on the Politics of Literary Theory. Routledge, 2000.
- Professing Criticism: Essays on the Organization of Literary Study. University of Chicago Press, 2022.
- On Close Reading, with an annotated bibliography and an online Close Reading Archive compiled by Scott Newstok, University of Chicago Press, 2025.
