= Georgette Elgey =

French journalist (1929–2019)

Georgette Elgey (24 February 1929 – 8 October 2019) was a French journalist and historian. She was the author of Histoire de la IVe République ("History of the Fourth Republic"), published in 6 volumes from 1965 to 2012.

== Biography ==
In her autobiography Toutes fenêtres ouvertes ("All Windows Open", 2017), Georgette Elgey wrote extensively about what she called "one of the last major upper-class scandals of the French Third Republic": her birth out of wedlock. Her father Georges Lacour-Gayet was an eminent historian, member of the Academy of Moral and Political Sciences, who was, at the time of her birth, 72 years old and a widower. Her mother Madeleine Léon, then in her mid-twenties, belonged to the Jewish upper-class – she was the great-granddaughter of Michel Lévy, France's first Jewish general. After Lacour-Gayet refused to marry her, Léon fought for years for Georgette to be officially recognised as his daughter, eventually losing in court but leaving the old man's reputation in shatters. From her father's marriage, she had three half-siblings Jacques, Thérèse and Robert Lacour-Gayet, who were considerably older than she. Robert also later became a historian.

Madeleine Léon was a convert to Roman Catholicism and Elgey was baptised as a child; yet, because of their Jewish roots, mother and daughter had to flee Paris and live in hiding during the occupation of France by Nazi Germany. After the war, Elgey studied stenography and worked as a secretary at a school of journalism. She started attending the school's classes and, although she never graduated, she caught the attention of the school's director Jacques Kayser, who introduced her to the historian Robert Aron. Through Aron, Elgey landed her first journalist assignments at La NEF, a magazine he directed alongside Lucie Faure. It was then she chose the nom-de-plume Georgette Elgey, from the French pronunciation of her father's initials, L.G.

Elgey also made her first steps as a historian thanks to Aron, whom she assisted in the writing of his Histoire de Vichy ("History of Vichy"), published in 1954. She worked as a journalist at L'Express and Paris-Presse and was editor-in-chief at Le Nouveau Candide, a magazine she helped launch in 1961. She however quit journalism in 1962 because, in her own words, she could not be "true to herself" in a line of work that required "too many compromises".

On the advice of Roger Stéphane, she then started working on what was to become her magnum opus, a history of the French Fourth Republic adequately titled Histoire de la IVe République. Published in the 1960s, the first two volumes were well received, with praise directed at Elgey's innovative use of oral testimonies in her historical research. Histoire de la IVe République took almost 50 years to complete, with the sixth and final volume published in 2012. In the 1970s, Elgey also worked as a senior editor for her publisher, Fayard, and after François Mitterrand was elected President of France in 1981, she joined his team as a technical adviser, in charge of the presidency's archives. From 2007 to 2016, she headed France's Conseil supérieur des archives ("Higher Archives Council"). She was made Commander of the Legion of Honour in 2009.
