= Kendall Thomas =

American law professor

Kendall Thomas is Nash Professor of Law, and Director of the Center for the Study of Law and Culture, at Columbia Law School.

== Biography ==
Kendall Thomas did his J.D. at Yale University's Law School in 1983 after having obtained his Bachelor of Fine Arts at Yale in 1978.

He won a Berlin Prize Fellowship from the American Academy in Berlin.

== Works ==
- Thomas, Kendall. Seriam os direitos dos transgêneros direitos Inumanos? RDFD, 2017, volume=22, series=1, pages=4–23
  - http://revistaeletronicardfd.unibrasil.com.br/index.php/rdfd/article/view/1032x%5B%5D
  - https://doi.org/10.25192/issn.1982-0496.rdfd.v22i11032
- Thomas, Kendall (October 1992). "Beyond the Privacy Principle". Columbia Law Review. 6. 92: 1431–1516. JSTOR 1122999.
- Thomas, Kendall (October 1993). "The Eclipse of Reason: A Rhetorical Reading of Bowers v. Hardwick". Virginia Law Review. 7. 79: 1805–1832. JSTOR 1073387.
- Kimberlé Crenshaw; Neil Gotanda; Gary Peller; et al., eds. (1995). Critical Race Theory: The Key Writings that Formed the Movement. The New Press. ISBN 978-1-56584-271-7.
- Judith Butler; John Guillory; Kendall Thomas (25 July 2000). What's Left of Theory?: New Work on the Politics of Literary Theory. Taylor & Francis. ISBN 978-0-203-90220-2.
