= Marie-Thérèse Maurette =

French educator (1890–1989)

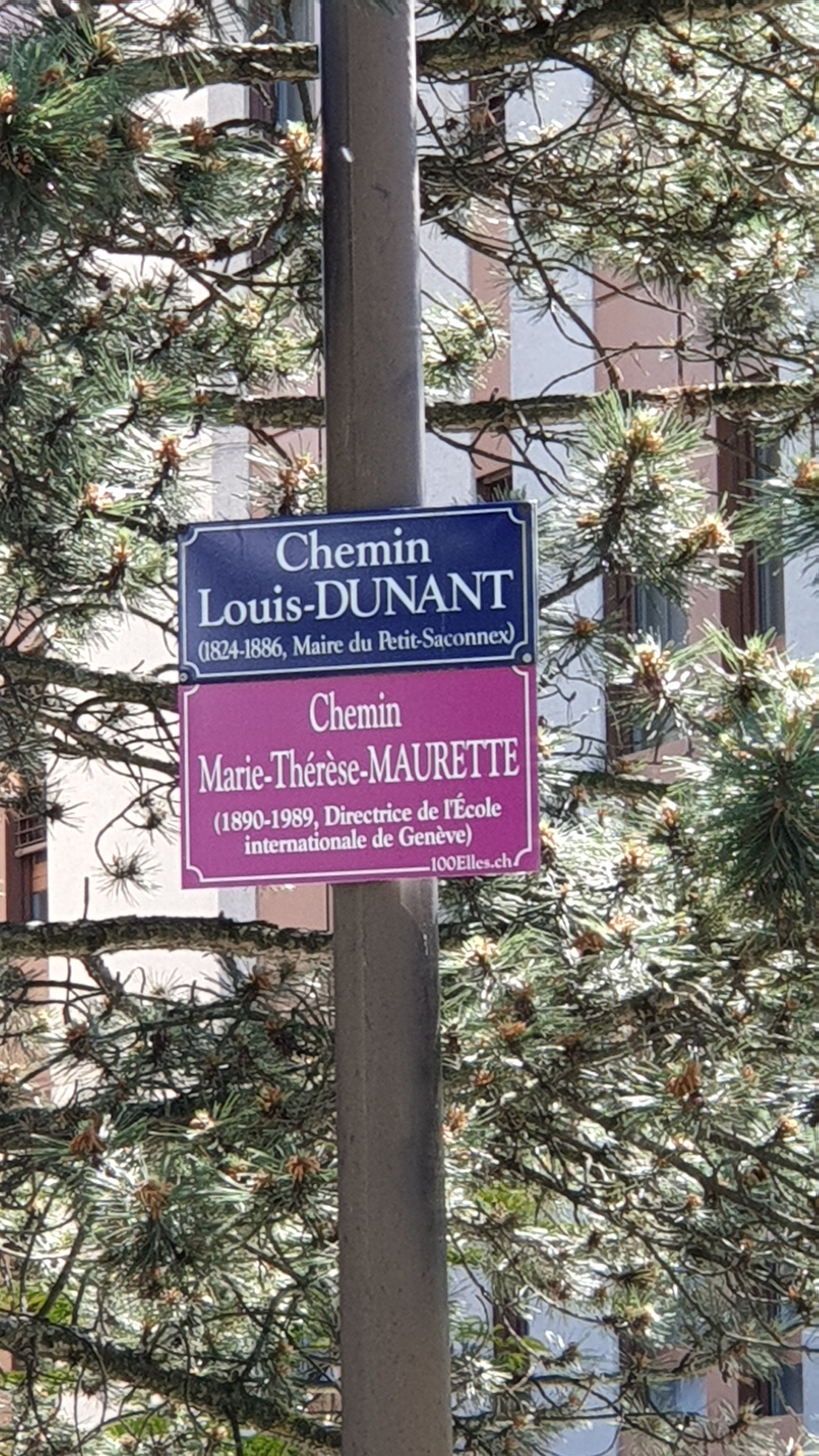
100elles-20190531-Chemin Marie-Thérèse Maurette-Chemin Louis Dunant

Marie-Thérèse Maurette (September 28, 1890 – June 25, 1989) was a French educator who for twenty years (1929–1949) was the director of the International School of Geneva (Ecole Internationale de Genève, often referred to as Ecolint), the world's oldest international school. She was the author of an original pedagogy of peace inspired by the international institutions present in Geneva: the League of Nations and International Labour Organization. Her pedagogy is the basis for the International Baccalaureate.

== Biography ==
Born Marie-Thérèse Charlotte Dupuy September 28, 1890, at 45 Rue d'Ulm in Paris, she was the daughter of Paul Dupuy (1856–1948), master supervisor, supervisor and secretary general from 1885 to 1925 of the École Normale Supérieure and Louise Marthe Lecoeur. Raised in the premises of the school of the rue d'Ulm, she met her husband; Fernand Maurette became a geographer and economist. They married on March 30, 1911, in Paris and in 1915 they had a son, filmmaker Marc Maurette.

She moved to Geneva soon after her marriage with her husband, who in 1924 joined the International Labour Organization (ILO) at the request of his former prep school colleague Albert Thomas.

In Geneva, she worked as an educator at the International School of Geneva, founded by local educators and officials of the League of Nations and the ILO.

She led the school as its Director from 1929 until 1949 and influenced its teaching advocating education for peace, based on respect and openness to others and with a strong international orientation. In 1948 she published the main lines of her teaching following a request of the UNESCO in a booklet entitled "Do Education Techniques for Peace Exist?"

The former Director General of the International School of Geneva and of the International Baccalaureate, Professor George Walker, dedicated a biography to her.

She died June 25, 1989, in Paris at the age of 98.

== Pedagogy ==
The pedagogy advocated by Marie-Thérèse Maurette is based on several elements:

1. The Synthetic Geography invented by her father Paul Dupuy or International Culture that introduces children first to a global image of the world (globe or world map) and to ignore for a time the country from which they come. They study the great elements regardless of frontiers to put the world into perspective. This knowledge is complemented by human geography, which includes demographics to introduce the concepts of relativity between countries and regions.
2. Teaching of national history begins much later than in most national schools. History is taught from twelve years old. First the world history is taught, then insertion of national history is done to its proper and relative importance.
3. The practice of two languages: French and English (official languages of the League of Nations), to practice the two modes of thinking inherent in these languages, and generally to understand the thinking of one's interlocutors.

The IB draws heavily on the educational principles of Marie-Thérèse Maurette.
