= Scholarship of Romanticism =

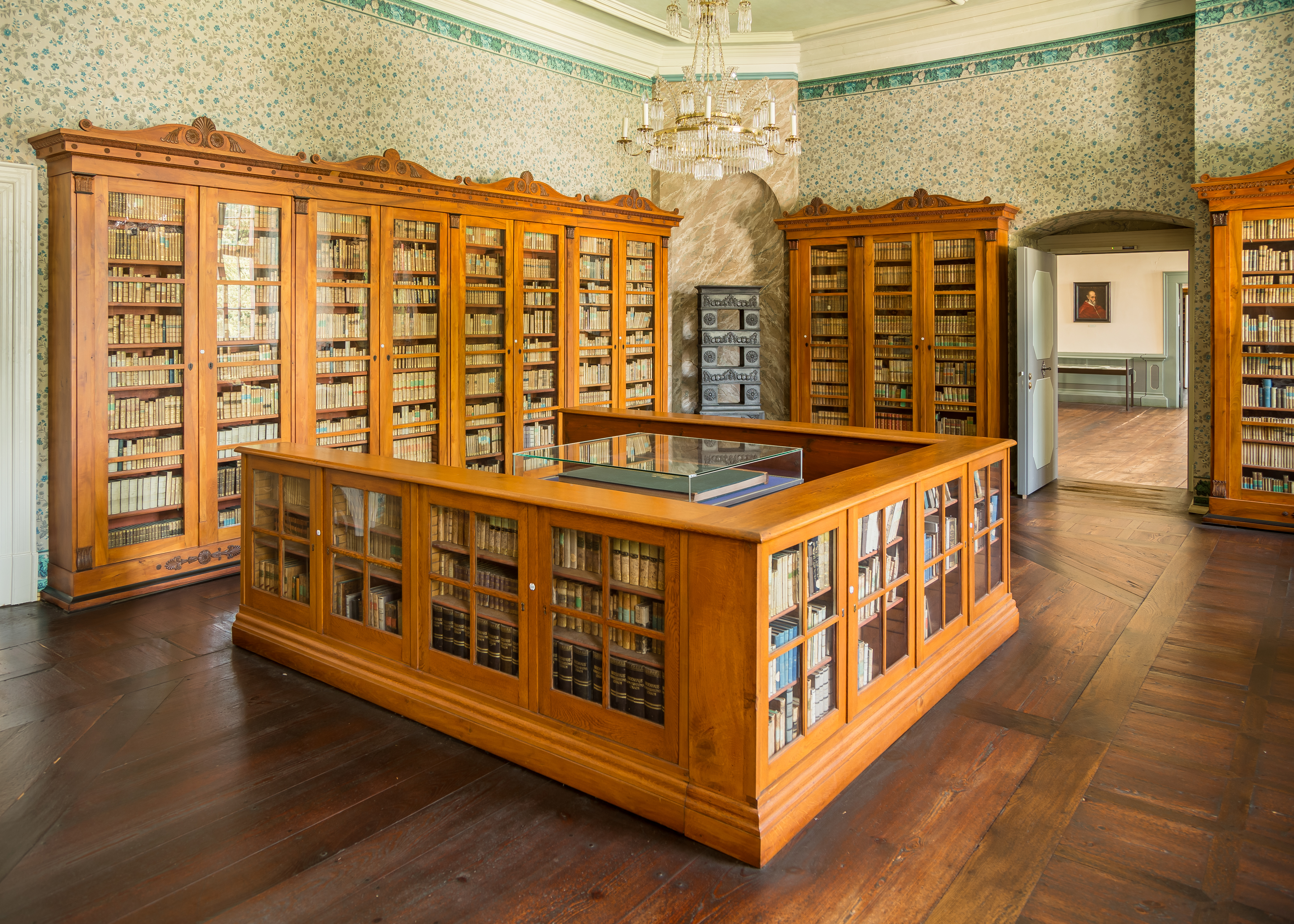
One room of the Fürstliche Bibliothek Corvey. A library with over 74,000 volumes, mostly of Romantic literature.

The more precise characterization and specific definition of Romanticism has been the subject of debate in the fields of intellectual history and literary history throughout the 20th century, without any great measure of consensus emerging. That it was part of the Counter-Enlightenment, a reaction against the Age of Enlightenment, is generally accepted in current scholarship. Its relationship to the French Revolution, which began in 1789 in the very early stages of the period, is clearly important, but highly variable depending on geography and individual reactions. Most Romantics can be said to be broadly progressive in their views, but a considerable number always had, or developed, a wide range of conservative views, and nationalism was in many countries strongly associated with Romanticism, as discussed in detail below.

== Evolution of the term "Romanticism" ==
=== Etymology and origins of the term ===
The group of words with the root "Roman" in the various European languages, such as "romance" and "Romanesque", has a complicated history. By the 18th century, European languages – notably German, French and Slavic languages – were using the term "Roman" in the sense of the English word "novel", i.e. a work of popular narrative fiction. This usage derived from the term "Romance languages", which referred to vernacular (or popular) language in contrast to formal Latin. Most such novels took the form of "chivalric romance", tales of adventure, devotion and honour.

The founders of Romanticism, critics (and brothers) August Wilhelm Schlegel and Friedrich Schlegel, began to speak of romantische Poesie ("romantic poetry") in the 1790s, contrasting it with "classic" but in terms of spirit rather than merely dating. Friedrich Schlegel wrote in his 1800 essay Gespräch über die Poesie ("Dialogue on Poetry"):

I seek and find the romantic among the older moderns, in Shakespeare, in Cervantes, in Italian poetry, in that age of chivalry, love and fable, from which the phenomenon and the word itself are derived.

The modern sense of the term spread more widely in France by its persistent use by Germaine de Staël in her De l'Allemagne (1813), recounting her travels in Germany. In England Wordsworth wrote in a preface to his poems of 1815 of the "romantic harp" and "classic lyre", but in 1820 Byron could still write, perhaps slightly disingenuously,

I perceive that in Germany, as well as in Italy, there is a great struggle about what they call 'Classical' and 'Romantic', terms which were not subjects of classification in England, at least when I left it four or five years ago.

It is only from the 1820s that Romanticism certainly knew itself by its name, and in 1824 the Académie française took the wholly ineffective step of issuing a decree condemning it in literature.

=== Application of the term to music ===
Although the term "Romanticism" when applied to music has come to imply the period roughly from 1800 until 1850, or else until around 1900, the contemporary application of "romantic" to music did not coincide with this modern interpretation. Indeed, one of the earliest sustained applications of the term to music occurs in 1789, in the Mémoires of André Grétry. This is of particular interest because it is a French source on a subject mainly dominated by Germans, but also because it explicitly acknowledges its debt to Jean-Jacques Rousseau (himself a composer, amongst other things) and, by so doing, establishes a link to one of the major influences on the Romantic movement generally. In 1810 E. T. A. Hoffmann named Haydn, Mozart and Beethoven as "the three masters of instrumental compositions" who "breathe one and the same romantic spirit". He justified his view on the basis of these composers' depth of evocative expression and their marked individuality. In Haydn's music, according to Hoffmann, "a child-like, serene disposition prevails", while Mozart (in the late E-flat major Symphony, for example) "leads us into the depths of the spiritual world", with elements of fear, love, and sorrow, "a presentiment of the infinite ... in the eternal dance of the spheres". Beethoven's music, on the other hand, conveys a sense of "the monstrous and immeasurable", with the pain of an endless longing that "will burst our breasts in a fully coherent concord of all the passions". This elevation in the valuation of pure emotion resulted in the promotion of music from the subordinate position it had held in relation to the verbal and plastic arts during the Enlightenment. Because music was considered to be free of the constraints of reason, imagery, or any other precise concept, it came to be regarded, first in the writings of Wackenroder and Tieck and later by writers such as Schelling and Wagner, as preeminent among the arts, the one best able to express the secrets of the universe, to evoke the spirit world, infinity, and the absolute.

This chronologic agreement of musical and literary Romanticism continued as far as the middle of the 19th century, when Richard Wagner denigrated the music of Meyerbeer and Berlioz as "neoromantic": "The Opera, to which we shall now return, has swallowed down the Neoromanticism of Berlioz, too, as a plump, fine-flavoured oyster, whose digestion has conferred on it anew a brisk and well-to-do appearance."

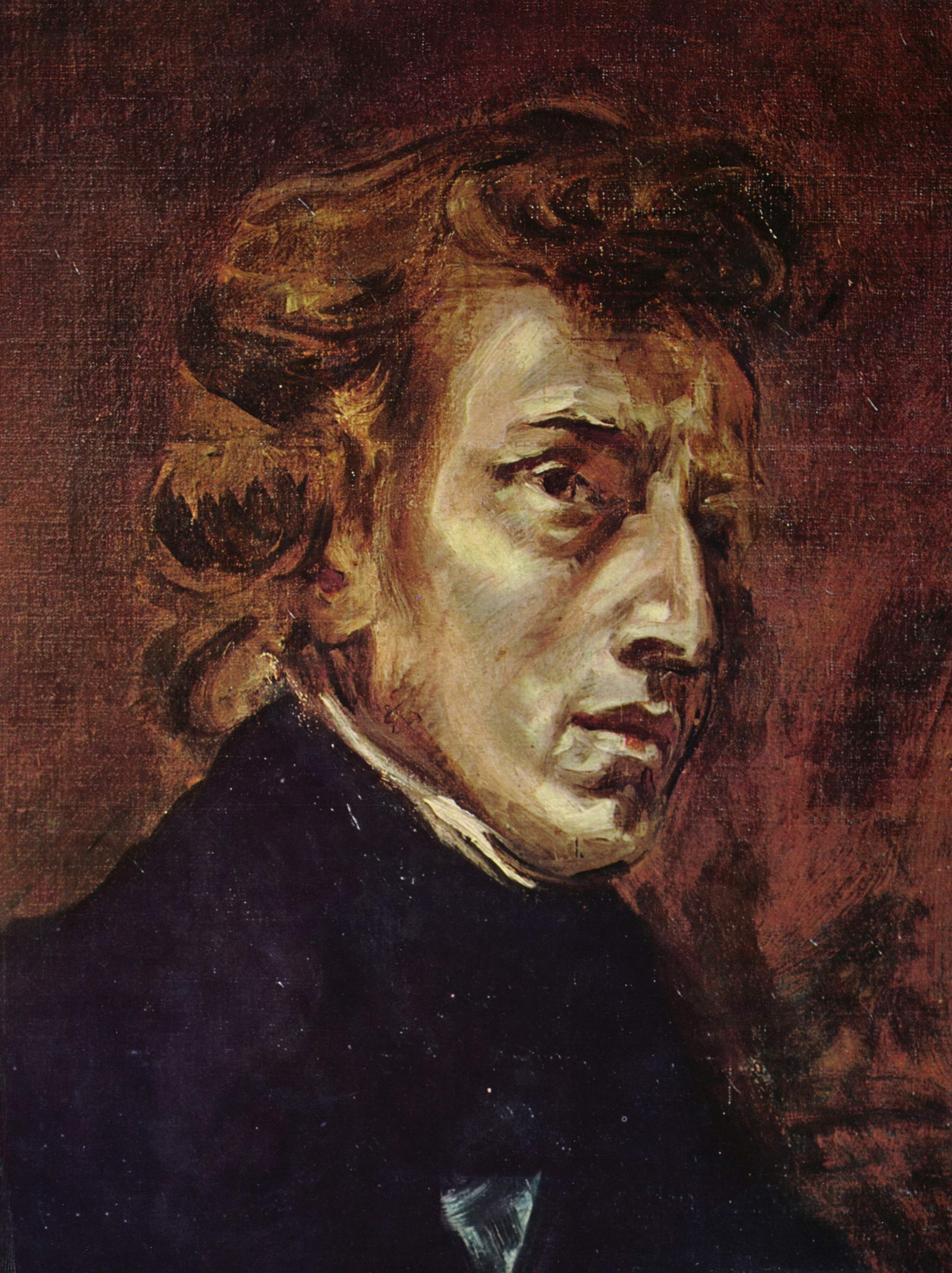
Frédéric Chopin in 1838 by Eugène Delacroix

It was only toward the end of the 19th century that the newly emergent discipline of Musikwissenschaft (musicology)—itself a product of the historicizing proclivity of the age—attempted a more scientific periodization of music history, and a distinction between Viennese Classical and Romantic periods was proposed. The key figure in this trend was Guido Adler, who viewed Beethoven and Franz Schubert as transitional but essentially Classical composers, with Romanticism achieving full maturity only in the post-Beethoven generation of Frédéric Chopin, Felix Mendelssohn, Robert Schumann, Hector Berlioz and Franz Liszt. From Adler's viewpoint, found in books like Der Stil in der Musik (1911), composers of the New German School and various late-19th-century nationalist composers were not Romantics but "moderns" or "realists" (by analogy with the fields of painting and literature), and this schema remained prevalent through the first decades of the 20th century.

By the second quarter of the 20th century, an awareness that radical changes in musical syntax had occurred during the early 1900s caused another shift in historical viewpoint, and the change of century came to be seen as marking a decisive break with the musical past. This in turn led historians such as Alfred Einstein to extend the musical "Romantic era" throughout the 19th century and into the first decade of the 20th. It has continued to be referred to as such in some of the standard music references such as The Oxford Companion to Music and Grout's History of Western Music but was not unchallenged. For example, the prominent German musicologist Friedrich Blume, the chief editor of the first edition of Die Musik in Geschichte und Gegenwart (1949–86), accepted the earlier position that Classicism and Romanticism together constitute a single period beginning in the middle of the 18th century, but at the same time held that it continued into the 20th century, including such pre-World War II developments as expressionism and neoclassicism. This is reflected in some notable recent reference works such as the New Grove Dictionary of Music and Musicians and the new edition of Musik in Geschichte und Gegenwart.

== Challenges in scholarship ==
=== Defining the Romantic Movement ===
Arthur Lovejoy attempted to demonstrate the difficulty of defining Romanticism in his seminal article "On The Discrimination of Romanticisms" in his Essays in the History of Ideas (1948); some scholars see Romanticism as essentially continuous with the present, some like Robert Hughes see in it the inaugural moment of modernity, while writers of the 19th Century such as Chateaubriand, Novalis and Samuel Taylor Coleridge saw it as the beginning of a tradition of resistance to Enlightenment rationalism—a "Counter-Enlightenment"— to be associated most closely with German Romanticism. Another early definition comes from Charles Baudelaire: "Romanticism is precisely situated neither in choice of subject nor exact truth, but in the way of feeling."

=== Marking the end of the Romantic Era ===
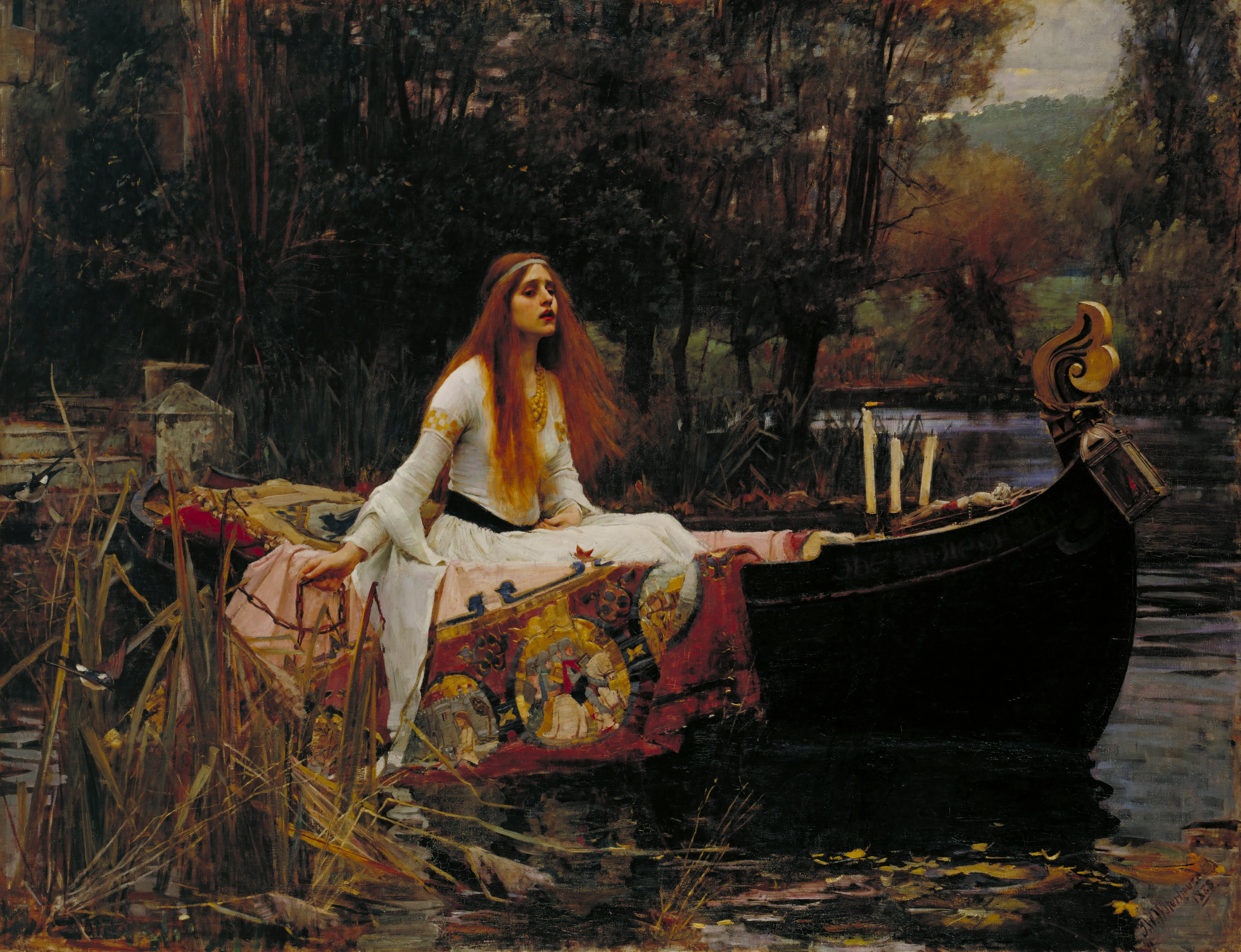
John William Waterhouse, The Lady of Shalott, 1888, after a poem by Tennyson

The end of the Romantic era is marked in some areas by a new style of Realism, which affected literature, especially the novel and drama, painting, and even music, through Verismo opera. This movement was led by France, with Balzac and Flaubert in literature and Courbet in painting; Stendhal and Goya were important precursors of Realism in their respective media. However, Romantic styles, now often representing the established and safe style against which Realists rebelled, continued to flourish in many fields for the rest of the century and beyond. In music such works from after about 1850 are referred to by some writers as "Late Romantic" and by others as "Neoromantic" or "Postromantic", but other fields do not usually use these terms; in English literature and painting the convenient term "Victorian" avoids having to characterise the period further.

In northern Europe, the Early Romantic visionary optimism and belief that the world was in the process of great change and improvement had largely vanished, and some art became more conventionally political and polemical as its creators engaged polemically with the world as it was. Elsewhere, including in very different ways the United States and Russia, feelings that great change was underway or just about to come were still possible. Displays of intense emotion in art remained prominent, as did the exotic and historical settings pioneered by the Romantics, but experimentation with form and technique was generally reduced, often replaced with meticulous technique, as in the poems of Tennyson or many paintings. If not realist, late 19th-century art was often extremely detailed, and pride was taken in adding authentic details in a way that earlier Romantics did not trouble with. Many Romantic ideas about the nature and purpose of art, above all the pre-eminent importance of originality, remained important for later generations, and often underlie modern views, despite opposition from theorists.

== Relationship to nationalism ==
In philosophy and the history of ideas, Romanticism was seen by Isaiah Berlin as disrupting for over a century the classic Western traditions of rationality and the idea of moral absolutes and agreed values, leading "to something like the melting away of the very notion of objective truth", and hence not only to nationalism, but also fascism and totalitarianism, with a gradual recovery coming only after World War II. For the Romantics, Berlin says,

in the realm of ethics, politics, aesthetics it was the authenticity and sincerity of the pursuit of inner goals that mattered; this applied equally to individuals and groups—states, nations, movements. This is most evident in the aesthetics of romanticism, where the notion of eternal models, a Platonic vision of ideal beauty, which the artist seeks to convey, however imperfectly, on canvas or in sound, is replaced by a passionate belief in spiritual freedom, individual creativity. The painter, the poet, the composer do not hold up a mirror to nature, however ideal, but invent; they do not imitate (the doctrine of mimesis), but create not merely the means but the goals that they pursue; these goals represent the self-expression of the artist's own unique, inner vision, to set aside which in response to the demands of some "external" voice—church, state, public opinion, family friends, arbiters of taste—is an act of betrayal of what alone justifies their existence for those who are in any sense creative.
