= Close reading =

Careful, sustained interpretation of a brief passage of a text

In literary criticism, close reading is the careful, sustained interpretation of a brief passage of a text. It emphasizes the particular over the general, paying precise attention to individual words, syntax, and the order in which the sentences unfold ideas, as well as the formal structures of the text.

Close reading involves considering both what is said in a passage (content) and how it is said (form), in order to make observations and offer interpretive insight.

== History ==
Literary close reading and commentaries have extensive precedent in the exegesis of religious texts, and more broadly, hermeneutics of ancient works. For example, Pazand, a genre of middle Persian literature, refers to the Zend (literally: 'commentary'/'translation') texts that offer explanation and close reading of the Avesta, the sacred texts of Zoroastrianism. The scriptural commentaries of the Talmud offer a commonly cited early predecessor to close reading. In Islamic studies, the close reading of the Quran has produced an immense corpus. In Western textual scholarship, the rise of higher criticism and biblical textual criticism in the 18th and 19th century Germany contributed to methods that treat texts as objects of analysis, independent of authorial or religious authority.

In the 1920s, British literary critics such as I. A. Richards, his student William Empson, and the poet T.S. Eliot, developed a method known as "practical criticism", which foregrounded linguistic detail and meaning over more impressionistic or biographical interpretation.

American New Critics of the 1930s and 1940s advocated for close reading as a central critical technique. The New Critics argued that literary works should be treated as autonomous, self-contained objects of analysis and that attention to textual detail yields more dependable interpretation than appeals to authorial intent, cultural context, or historical background. For these critics such as Cleanth Brooks, William K. Wimsatt, John Crowe Ransom, and Allen Tate, close reading was the most effective means of engaging a literary work, as its focus on the interplay of language and form enabled analysis of the text’s internal coherence and complexity. Their influence on American literary criticism and English departments held sway for several decades, and even after New Criticism faded from prominence in American universities in the waning years of the Cold War, close reading remained a fundamental, almost naturalized, skill amongst literary critics. By the turn of the 21st century, efforts to historicize New Critical aesthetics and its apolitical pretense prompted scholars, especially in departments of English, to debate the fate of close reading, questioning its status as a critical practice.

In 2010, the Association of Departments of English (ADE) published two bulletin issues containing a series of articles that reassessed the role of close reading in 21st-century literary studies. The contributors noted that shifts in academic practice, student engagement, and broader cultural conditions had prompted renewed reflection on the continued relevance of close reading to the study of literature. Jonathan Culler noted that because the discipline had taken close reading for granted, it had disappeared from discussions of the goals of literary criticism. For Culler, as for Jane Gallop, that absence needed remedying, and therefore signaled an opportunity for departments of English to renew—in order to capitalize on—one of the more distinctive traits of studying literature. If New Criticism and its isolationist stance had given way to the politicization of literary studies, and if technological developments were changing the very ways in which people read, Culler and Gallop emphasized that the signature of close reading, meticulous attention to the workings of language and form, still had value. N. Katherine Hayles and John Guillory, meanwhile, each interested in the impact of digital media on the ways people read, argued that close reading skills were not only translatable to the digital context, but could also exist productively alongside the hyper-reading that web interfaces and links had generated.

== Principles and practice ==
While New Criticism popularized close reading in universities, it tended to emphasize its principles and offer extended examples rather than prescribe specific methods and practices. As John Guillory points out, close reading entails "a technique, a particular kind of methodical procedure that can be described but not prescribed, and that is transmitted largely by demonstration and imitation." A tendency towards what Vincent B. Leitch calls "canonical statements" appeared in essays and book-length studies, from John Crowe Ransom's "The New Criticism" (1941) and Allen Tate's "A Note on Autotelism" (1949), to Cleanth Brooks' The Well Wrought Urn (1947), Rene Wellek and Austin Warren's Theory of Literature (1949), and W.K. Wimsatt's The Verbal Icon (1954). The first ten chapters of The Well Wrought Urn thus focus individually on poems across British literary history (John Donne, William Shakespeare, John Milton, Alexander Pope, Thomas Gray, John Keats, William Wordsworth, Alfred, Lord Tennyson, W.B. Yeats, and T.S. Eliot) before concluding with "The Heresy of Paraphrase", in which Brooks abstracts the premises on which his analyses rest. Meanwhile, when Wellek and Warren describe their preference for an "intrinsic" study of literature in Theory of Literature, they refer to examples of elements they claim are crucial to a work—from euphony, rhythm, and meter to image, metaphor, and myth—and cite concrete examples of these drawn from literary history, but do not indicate steps by which readers might translate such thinking into their own analyses. Wimsatt takes a mixed approach in The Verbal Icon, combining theoretical chapters ("The Intentional Fallacy", "The Affective Fallacy") with those that discuss concerns he feels are necessary to the study of poetry ("The Concrete Universal", "Symbol and Metaphor", "The Substantive Level", "One Relation of Rhyme to Reason", "When is Variation 'Elegant'?", "Verbal Style: Logical and Counterlogical"), but he too leaves it to his readers to imagine how they might deploy these views.

As Culler notes in his essay for the 2010 bulletin of the American Departments of English, this tendency not to make statements of method meant that most students of the New Critics learned by example. Thus in the New Critical classroom, "the charismatic pedagogue could pose a question you had not thought of about relations between form and meaning or point to a textual difficulty that had escaped your attention." More than fifty years later, this "closeness of close reading" remains vital to the work of more recent thinkers whose thinking has contributed to the radical changes in literary studies and displaced New Criticism. Of these he cites his contemporary, the deconstructionist Barbara Johnson, who stands out for her claim that the value of close reading lies in its capacity for taking seriously what does not immediately make sense. Well aware of the stark differences between New Criticism and deconstruction, Culler here brings the two together, suggesting that their shared investments indicate an understanding of close reading worth maintaining.

In French criticism, close reading is similar to explication de texte, the tradition of textual interpretation in literary study, as proposed by Gustave Lanson. As an analytical technique, close reading compares and contrasts the concept of distant reading, the technique for "understanding literature, not by studying particular texts, but by aggregating and analyzing massive amounts of data", as described, by Kathryn Schulz, in "What is Distant Reading?", an article about the literary scholar Franco Moretti.

== Examples ==
Brooks's discussion of John Keats's "Ode on a Grecian Urn" embodies his use of close reading. In "Keats's Sylvan Historian", he finds the controversy over the poem's famous lines misplaced, and insists instead that "the ambiguity" of "Beauty is truth, truth beauty—that is all/Ye know on earth, and all ye need to know" is best understood as an expression of the urn itself (151–153). The poem pursues this ambiguity, he writes, in lines that describe the urn on the one hand as a "bride of quietness" and a "foster-child of silence" and on the other, a "sylvan historian" (155). In this way the poem describes the urn in paradoxical terms much as the urn utters a paradoxical line. Brooks then pursues this logic by considering how "sylvan historian" might not only describe the urn as a kind of historian but also the kind of history the urn is said to tell. Further, if he claims that this history is uncertain because it's not clear "what men or gods" feature in it, he continues that line of thinking as he proceeds through the ode's stanzas: when he emphasizes that the "unheard melodies" of the figures depicted on the urn's face are "sweeter than any audible music", that "action goes on though the actors are motionless", that "the maiden, always to be kissed, never actually kissed", that the "boughs...cannot shed their leaves", and when he claims that this "ironic undercurrent" only increases over the course of the poem, to culminate in those infamous lines (156–159, 164). From following the poem in this way, Brooks arrives at the assertion that his interpretation is "derived from the context of the "Ode" itself" (164).

Brooks's close reading is typical of the New Critical investment in the textual object alone. Yet scholars have also found close reading productive for more politically and socially invested work, thereby refusing the New Critical belief in literary transcendence while seizing on the care with which it treated textuality. In The Madwoman in the Attic: The Woman Writer and the Nineteenth-Century Literary Imagination (1979), best known as one of the earliest statements of feminist literary criticism, Sandra Gilbert and Susan Gubar deployed close reading to make a case for the distinctiveness of the female literary imagination. The sixteen chapters of Madwoman thus pursue their arguments—that women writers expressed their anxiety about authorship, their rage over being constrained to docile femininity, their canny encoding of their patriarchal critique—with the attention to language, imagery, and form Gilbert and Gubar had been trained to wield as graduate students in the late 1960s. New Critical echoes are thus evident in the individual chapters devoted to close readings of Mary Shelley's Frankenstein, Emily Bronte's Wuthering Heights, Charlotte Bronte's The Professor, Jane Eyre, Shirley, and Villette, but so is the political innovation. Reviewers—academic and mainstream—recognized this trait, describing the two scholars as "gnostic heretics who claim to have found the secret code that unlocks the mysteries in old texts" (Schreiber 11) and their interpretations as a "skillful joint peeling away of the layers" of women's writing" (129).

In an even more extreme example, Jacques Derrida in Ulysses Gramophone devotes eighty-six pages to the word "yes" in James Joyce's novel Ulysses, an effort which J. Hillis Miller describes as a "hyperbolic, extravagant, even outrageous explosion" of the technique of close reading.

== Teaching close reading in the United States ==
The push for more close-reading instruction in primary and secondary education is partially due to increased feedback from college professors in the early-mid 2000s that students were arriving in university classrooms with few comprehension skills. The increased demand for students to acquire concrete skills in high school that they would need in transitioning to higher education and to adult life culminated in the creation of the Common Core State Standards in 2009. Since then, there has been a push for English language arts (ELA) teachers, especially at the secondary level, to help students develop close-reading strategies. Several of the ELA standards for reading literature require students to be able to cite direct textual evidence, and to analyze words in context. For example, CCSS.ELA-Literacy.RL.9-10.4 asks students to "Determine the meaning of words and phrases as they are used in the text, including figurative and connotative meanings; analyze the cumulative impact of specific word choices on meaning and tone (e.g., how the language evokes a sense of time and place; how it sets a formal or informal tone)."

=== Strategies ===
Today, as most states have adopted the Common Core Standards, there is an increasing number of resources designed to help teachers instruct and implement close-reading strategies in their classrooms. In 2012, Kylene Beers and Robert E. Probst published Notice & Note: Strategies for Close Reading, which established six "signposts" that alert readers to significant moments in a work of literature and encourage students to read closely.

Another resource, developed by Beth Burke (NBCT) for the Tampa Bay Times NIE (Newspaper in Education), presents the steps involved in close reading and how to scaffold the strategies for students. She recommends using the "gradual release model" in instruction, beginning by modeling a close reading in front of the class, then having students work on the strategy in groups before attempting it alone.

Additional ways students are supported in close-reading instruction include providing graphic organizers that help them group their ideas with textual evidence. Many other educational resources and guides to close reading exist in order to help students of all levels and in particular, close reading poetry. For example, see The Close Reading of Poetry: A Practical Introduction and Guide to Explication.

== See also ==
- Book report
- Explication de Texte
- Reading
- Slow reading
- Distant reading
