= Franco Moretti =

Italian literary historian and theorist (born 1950)

- Born: 1950 (age 75–76); Sondrio, Lombardy, Italy
- Education: Sapienza University of Rome

Franco Moretti (born 1950) is an Italian literary historian and theorist. He graduated in Modern Literatures from the University of Rome in 1972. He has taught at the universities of Salerno (1979–1983) and Verona (1983–1990); in the US, at Columbia (1990–2000) and Stanford (2000–2016), where in 2000 he founded the Center for the Study of the Novel, and in 2010, with Matthew Jockers, the Stanford Literary Lab. Moretti has given the Gauss Seminars at Princeton, the Beckman Lectures at Berkeley, the Carpenter Lectures at the University of Chicago, and has been a lecturer and visiting professor in many countries, including, until the end of 2019, the Digital Humanities Institute at the École Polytechnique Fédérale de Lausanne.

== Biography ==
Born in Sondrio in 1950, Franco Moretti graduated in Modern Literatures from the University of Rome in 1972, after writing a dissertation on the British poets and intellectuals of the 1930s. He was initially a researcher at the Universities of Pescara and Rome (1972–1979), one of the founding editors of the journals Calibano and Il leviatano, and a contributor to the cultural pages of the new left daily newspaper il manifesto. In 1977–78 he was a Fulbright scholar at Occidental College. Later, he taught English and Comparative Literature at the Universities of Salerno (1979–1983), Verona (1983–1990), Columbia (1990–2000) and Stanford (2000–2016), where in 2000 he founded the Center for the Study of the Novel, and in 2010, with Matthew Jockers, the Stanford Literary Lab. A volume collecting a selection of Literary Lab pamphlets has recently been translated into French, German, Spanish, and Italian, while individual pamphlets have appeared into more than a dozen languages, including Chinese, Russian, Turkish and Korean.

Over the years, Moretti has been visiting professor at various universities in Europe and North America – including Copenhagen, Toronto, La Sapienza, and the École des Hautes Études en Sciences Sociales in Paris – twice a fellow of the Wissenschaftskolleg zu Berlin (1999–2000, 2012–2013), advisor of the French Ministry for Education, and member of the "Digital Humanities Institute" of the École Polytechnique Fédérale de Lausanne in Switzerland (2016–2019). He has given the Gauss Seminars at Princeton, the Beckman Lectures at Berkeley, and the Carpenter Lectures at the University of Chicago, the Patten Lectures at Indiana University and the Iser lecture at the University of Konstanz. The work of this "great iconoclast of literary criticism", as The Guardian once called him, has been translated into 30 languages, and has been the object of two collections of essays – Reading Graphs, Maps, Trees. Critical Responses to Franco Moretti, in 2011, and Lire de près, de loin, in 2014. The essays Moretti collected in Distant Reading received in 2014 the prize of the "National Book Critics' Circle". The Los Angeles Review of Books and PMLA have devoted special forums to his work, as has the Russian journal New Literary History in 2018, and the French journal Romantisme in 2021. His work – and in particular the formula "distant reading", presented in the essay "Conjectures on World Literature"– has inspired books and journal issues, and generated work in the disparate fields of literary criticism, philosophy, political science, law, plus conferences and long-term research projects in several countries. Most recently, Moretti's work has been examined in the collection Critica sperimentale, with contributions by Gisèle Sapiro, Patricia McManus, Guido Mazzoni, Francoise Lavocat, Mads Rosendahl Thomsen, Stefano Ercolino, Jérôme David and others. He has over 30,000 Google Scholar citations.

In 2017, Moretti was accused in a Facebook post of having sexually assaulted a woman in 1985. He denied the accusation, stating their relationship had been fully consensual. Days later, a student newspaper mentioned two further episodes, both denied by Moretti. No formal proceeding of any sort was ever opened against him anywhere. A Stanford spokesperson declared that the university was reviewing the case and "determining whether there are any actions for Stanford to take", and the process was concluded without any action ever being taken. Moretti is currently emeritus professor at Stanford, a member of the American Academy of Arts and Sciences, of the American Philosophical Society, and of the scientific board of the Institute for World Literature at Harvard. He has taught at the Ecole Polytechnique Federale de Lausanne (2017–2019) and has been a permanent fellow at the Wissenschaftskolleg in Berlin (2015–2023).

He is a regular contributor to New Left Review, and has continued to advise doctoral students in various countries (Tartu, Lausanne, Harvard, Paris, Siena), receiving an honorary doctorate from Babeș-Bolyai University in Cluj, and becoming a member of the Brno Narratological Circle. His book Far Country. Scenes from American Culture – published simultaneously in Italy, the United States and Britain in 2019 – is framed by a long reflection on his first and last university courses, that covers the years from 1979 to 2016; the German edition – Ein fernes Land, Konstanz University Press, 2020 – has been saluted as a "future standard for the field" and "a mandatory reading for all those who are beginning to study the humanities".

He has also published a critical and self-critical reflection on the quantitative turn in literary studies – Falso Movimento – which has recently appeared in several European languages.

During the pandemic of 2020–22, Moretti has continued to give lectures online (Copenhagen, Berlin, Delhi, Naples, São Paulo and more), and has since started lecturing again in several European countries. He is currently Principal Investigator of the multinational project “Measuring European Tragedy” based at the Lucian Blaga University in Sibiu. In 2025, he has been a visiting professor at the University of São Paulo, and has been named Honorary Professor at the Department of Chinese Language and Literature, East China Normal University in Shanghai.

He is the brother of Italian filmmaker and Palme d'Or-winner Nanni Moretti. He played roles in three films directed by his brother: The Defeat (La sconfitta, 1973, short), Pâté de bourgeois (1973, short), and I Am Self Sufficient (Io sono un autarchico, 1976).

== Work ==
Moretti has made several contributions to literary history and theory. Some ideas popularized by Moretti are traceable to earlier sources. Opposing subjective interpretations of literature, Moretti proposed a number of materialistic, empirical approaches to literature and other arts. His major contributions were in the domains of literary geography (now largely associated with Moretti's name) and digital humanities; he also contributed to combining literary studies with the world-systems analysis and Darwinian theory of evolution. Moretti has coined several concepts that are now widely used in the humanities, the main of which is distant reading. Distant reading is opposed to close reading: a traditional approach in literary studies when a critic closely examines a separate text, traces all the possible intertextual connections. Distant reading has the opposite goal: the scholar should "step back" from an individual text to see a larger picture: for example, the history of a genre during a century or the evolution of a particular artistic device over many decades.

=== The history of bourgeois culture ===
Moretti's scientific work has largely focused on European bourgeois culture, beginning with The Way of the World. The Bildungsroman in European Culture (1987, second enlarged ed. 2000). The book examines the great tradition of the novel of youth – Wilhelm Meister, Pride and Prejudice, The Red and the Black, Eugene Onegin, Lost Illusions, Great Expectations, Sentimental Education, Middlemarch ... – considered as the "symbolic form" that allowed nineteenth-century culture to make sense of the political revolutions and economic transformations of western modernity. Modern Epic. The World System from Goethe to Garcia Marquez (1996), broadened the analysis in space and time, examining texts that transcend national cultures in trying to represent the planetary system of capitalism: Faust, Moby-Dick, Wagner's Ring, Ulysses, The Waste Land, and the great narratives of Latin-American magic realism. More recently, The Bourgeois. Between History and Literature (2013) has completed this trilogy of bourgeois existence by tracing its historical keywords ("useful", "comfort", "efficiency", "seriousness", "roba"...), and following the metamorphoses of "prose" from Defoe to Ibsen and Max Weber.

=== Literary geography ===
Moretti has offered a new – cartographic – perspective on literature in his Atlas of the European Novel (1997). On the one hand, he demonstrated geographic patterns that can be traced within literature: the geography of Jane Austen's characters, places of origin of villains in British literature, the locations of Balzac's novels, etc. This, though, was hardly original: Vladimir Nabokov famously taught novelists such as Jane Austen and James Joyce with the aid of location maps. On the other hand, Moretti suggested studying the geography of literary economics: how and why translations of novels spread across Europe, how book selection in small town libraries differ from book selection in the libraries in large cities, etc.

=== Digital humanities ===
Together with Matthew Jockers, Moretti founded Stanford Literary Lab in 2010. Already in his Atlas of the European Novel, Moretti approached literature with quantitative methods. The Literary Lab continued this direction of work, but this time quantifying literature via the tools of digital text analysis. Those methods include counting word frequencies, topic modeling, building character networks, etc. The results of Lab's work were published as Pamphlets of the Literary Lab (the history of how Lab arrived at this unusual publication format is described by Moretti in Pamphlet 12). Stanford Literary Lab became one of the pioneering groups pursuing computational criticism, and a visible actor in the new field of digital humanities. Equally novel was the concept of the humanities "lab", as it is mostly associated with hard sciences.

=== World-systems analysis ===
In many of his works, Moretti relies on one strand of historical macrosociology – world-systems analysis – and its main theorist, Immanuel Wallerstein. World-systems analysis divides all countries into three groups: core, semi-peripheral, and peripheral. Core countries dominate the world by having a monopoly over some kind of products, which they export to the peripheral and semi-peripheral countries. Over time, the latter countries learn how to produce the much needed products themselves, but core countries usually acquire monopolies over other important products, and so the structure of the world-system remains relatively stable. Moretti suggested that the same principle may work in the domain of arts. Certain countries have monopoly over producing film or literary forms, while other countries import those forms. According to Moretti, in the 19th century England and France constituted the core of the literary world-system, exporting novels worldwide; today, Hollywood, which exports movies has a similar role.

=== Literary evolution ===
Applying Darwinian theory to literature is an idea that dates back to the late 19th century (initial attempts were made by Ferdinand Brunetière and Alexander Veselovsky). Literary Darwinism becomes a popular movement in 20th century literary criticism. Joseph Carroll, Denis Dutton, Jonathan Gottschall, Brian Boyd, Ellen Spolsky, Nancy Easterlin, among others, contributed to the evolutionary literary studies. In their wake, Moretti used the techniques of "distant reading": statistics and computation to study literary evolution. The interest in Darwin's theory in the humanities coincided with the emergence in the 1990s and 2000s of the new research domain called cultural evolution.

== Publications ==
=== Books ===
- Interpretazioni di Eliot. Roma: Savelli. 1975.
- Letteratura e ideologie negli anni trenta inglesi. Bari: Adriatica. 1976.
- Signs Taken for Wonders: Essays in the Sociology of Literary Forms. Translated by Susan Fischer; David Forgacs; David Miller. London: NLB: Verso Editions. 1983. ISBN 978-0860910640.
- Il romanzo di formazione. [Milano]: Garzanti. 1986.
- Segni e stili del moderno. Torino: Einaudi. 1987. ISBN 978-8806593988.
- The Way of the World: The Bildungsroman in European Culture. London: Verso. 1987. ISBN 978-0860911593.
- Opere mondo: saggio sulla forma epica dal Faust a Cent'anni di solitudin. Torino: Einaudi. 1994. ISBN 978-8806135454.
- The Modern Epic: The World-System from Goethe to García Márquez. London, New York: Verso. 1996. ISBN 978-1859849347.
- Atlante del romanzo europeo, 1800–1900. Torino: G. Einaudi. 1997. ISBN 978-8806141325.
- Atlas of the European novel, 1800–1900. London, New York: Verso. 1998. ISBN 978-1859848838.
- Il romanzo. Torino: G. Einaudi. 2003. ISBN 978-8806152901.
- Graphs, Maps, Trees: Abstract Models for a Literary History. London, New York: Verso. 2005. ISBN 978-1844670260.
- The Novel. Princeton, N.J.: Princeton University Press. 2006. ISBN 978-0691049472.
- Lee, Richard E.; Moretti, Franco (2011). Immanuel Wallerstein and the Problem of the World. Duke University Press Books. ISBN 9780822348481.
- Distant Reading. London: Verso. 2013. ISBN 9781781680841.
- The Bourgeois: Between History and Literature. Brooklyn, N.Y.: Verso. 2013. ISBN 9781781680858.
- Far Country: Scenes from American Culture. New York City, NY: Farrar, Straus and Giroux. 2019. ISBN 9780374272708.
- Falso movimento. La svolta quantitativa nello studio della letteratura. Milano: Nottetempo. 2022. ISBN 9788874529384.

=== Turkish translations ===
- Uzak Okuma. Translated by Onur Gayretli. İstanbul Bilgi Üniversitesi Yayınları. 2021.
- Tarih ile Edebiyat Arasında Burjuva. Translated by Eren Buğlalılar. İletişim Yayınları. 2015.
- Mucizevi Göstergeler: Edebi Biçimlerinin Sosyolojisi Üzerine. Translated by Zeynep Altok. Metis Yayınları. 2005.
- Modern Epik: Goethe'den Garcia Marquez'e Dünya Sistemi. Translated by Mehmet Murat Şahin. Agora Kitaplığı. 2005.

=== Selected journal articles ===
- Flores D'Arcais, Paolo; Moretti, Franco (March 1, 1976). "Paradoxes of the Italian Political Crisis". New Left Review (96): 35.
- "Paradoxes of the Italian Political Crisis". Genre. 15: 7. Spring 1982.
- "The Dialectic of Fear". New Left Review (126): 67. November 1982.
- "The Comfort of Civilization". Representations (12): 115–139. October 1985.
- "The Moment of Truth". New Left Review (159): 39. September 1986.
- "The Spell of Indecision". New Left Review (164): 27. July 1987.
- "Words Words Words: A Reply to Tony Pinkney". New Left Review (167page=127). January 1988.
- "Modern European Literature: A Geographical Sketch". New Left Review (206): 86. July 1994.
- "Narrative Markets, ca. 1850". Review (Fernand Braudel Center). 20 (2): 151–174. April 1997.
- Moretti, Franco (1999). "Structure, Change, and Survival: A Response to Winthrop-Young". Diacritics. 29 (2): 41–42. doi:10.1353/dia.1999.0014. S2CID 143604501.
- Moretti, F. (2000). "The Slaughterhouse of Literature". Modern Language Quarterly. 61 (1): 207–228. doi:10.1215/00267929-61-1-207. S2CID 161329715.
- "Conjectures on World Literature". New Left Review (1): 54. January 2000.
- "'New York Times' Obituaries". New Left Review (2): 104. March 2000.
- "MoMA 2000—The Capitulation". New Left Review (4): 98. July 2000.
- "Markets of the Mind". New Left Review (5): 111. September 2000.
- "Planet Hollywood". New Left Review (9): 90. May 2001.
- "More Conjectures". New Left Review (20): 73. March 2003.
- "Graphs, Maps, Trees" (PDF). New Left Review (24): 67. November 2003.
- "Graphs, Maps, Trees—2". New Left Review (26): 79–103. March 2004.
- "Graphs, Maps, Trees—3". New Left Review (28): 43–63. July 2004.
- "World-Systems Analysis, Evolutionary Theory, 'Weltliteratur'". Review (Fernand Braudel Center). 28 (3): 217–228. January 2005.
- "The end of the beginning: A reply to Christopher Prendergast (Graphs, Maps, Trees: Abstract Models for a Literary History)". New Left Review (41): 71. September 2006.
- "Cartes". Romantisme (4): 11. 2007.
- "The novel: History and Theory". New Left Review (52): 111–124. July 2008.
- "Style, Inc. Reflections on Seven Thousand Titles (British Novels, 1740–1850)". Critical Inquiry. 36 (1pages=134–158). 2009.
- Moretti, Franco (2009). "Critical ResponseII. Relatively Blunt". Critical Inquiry. 36 (1): 172–174. doi:10.1086/606127. S2CID 162326902.
- Moretti, Franco (January 2010). "The Grey Area: Ibsen and the Spirit of Capitalism". New Left Review (61): 117–131.
- Moretti, F. (Spring 2010). "History of the Novel, Theory of the Novel". Novel. 43 (1): 1–10. doi:10.1215/00295132-2009-055.
- Moretti, Franco (March 2011). "Network Theory, Plot Analysis". New Left Review. II (68): 80–102.
- "Introduction to 'Learning to Read Data'". Victorian Studies. 54 (1): 6, 186. Autumn 2011.
- Moretti, Franco (May 2013). "Fog". New Left Review. II (81): 59–92.
- "Sobre l'evolució literària". L'Espill (43): 150–167. 2013.
- Moretti, Franco; Sanders, Valerie; Shook, Karen (June 27, 2013). "Middle-Class Value Judgement". The Times Higher Education Supplement (2107): 46.
- Moretti, Franco (November 2013). "'Operationalizing' or, the Function of Measurement in Literary Theory". New Left Review. II (84): 103–119.
- Moretti, Franco (2015). "Lukac's Theory of the Novel". New Left Review. II (91): 39–44.
- Moretti, Franco; Pestre, Dominique (2015). "Bankspeak: The Language of World Bank Reports". New Left Review. II (92): 75–99.

== Awards and honors ==
- 2013 National Book Critics Circle Award (Criticism), winner for Distant Reading
- 2015 Moretti is elected a permanent fellow at the Berlin Institute for Advanced Study
