= Gustave Lanson =

French historian and literary critic (1857-1934)

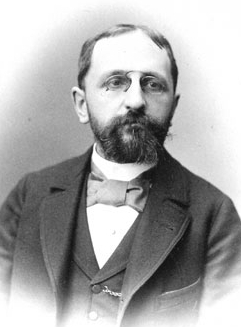
Lanson in 1895

Gustave Lanson (French pronunciation: [ɡystav lɑ̃sɔ̃]; 5 August 1857 – 15 December 1934) was a French historian and literary critic. He taught at the Sorbonne and the École Normale Supérieure in Paris. A dominant figure in French literary criticism, he influenced several generations of writers and critics through his teachings, which were anti-systematic and promoted a scrupulous and erudite approach to texts via extensive firsthand research, inventorying, and in-depth historical investigation.

== Biography ==
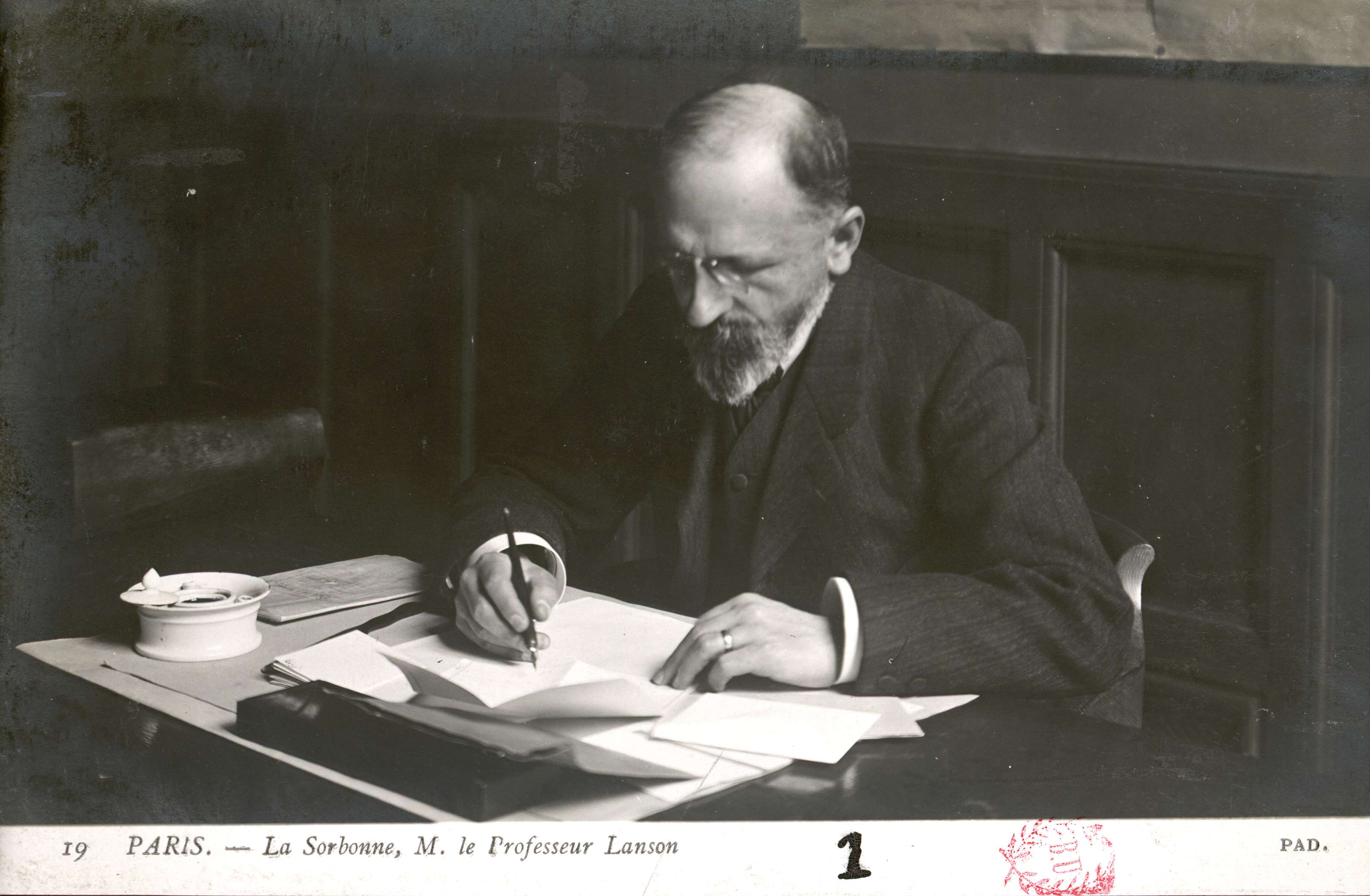
The Sorbonne. Professor Gustave Lanson (Bibliothèque de La Sorbonne, NuBIS)

Lanson was a major figure in the reformation of the French university system at the beginning of the 20th century, as well as a dominant force in French literary criticism until well after his death. He is known primarily for his writings on literary history, particularly his attempts to fuse the studies of literature and of culture; in the former area he expanded upon, and in part questioned, the idea of "race, milieu, and moment" as described by Hippolyte Taine. He also contributed a great deal to the study of pedagogy, arguing for the pedagogical importance of the explication de texte, the French predecessor of close reading. Among his shorter works is a still-authoritative 1892 life of the French poet Nicolas Boileau-Despreaux in the series Les Grands Ecrivains Francais.

Lanson proposed the idea of "literary sociology," a complex formulation of the relationship between social influences on an author, readers' expectations, and the text. For Lanson a text was neither a mere product of collective social forces nor an autonomous work by an autonomous genius, but something in between. The text was a composite work on which society exerted powerful and unseen forces but that could still escape those forces in order to present something outside of them: perhaps a hope or fantasy of something better. The composite nature of Lanson's model allowed him to imagine a text with multiple intended audiences: the immediate readership of the society that produced it, and another, ideal one that could be partially conditioned by the text itself.

In 1911 Lanson was a visiting professor at Columbia University in New York City. During this period he travelled extensively in the United States, visiting a number of college campuses, and later wrote about his experiences. Lanson was struck by the importance of religion on American campuses, though he also commented that the unity inspired by shared religion was fading in favor of shared interest in collegiate sports, particularly American football.

Lanson was the second President of the Modern Humanities Research Association, for the years 1919–20.

In 1919, he became director of the École Normale Supérieure; for years he was the target of Jean-Paul Sartre’s satirical attacks, and got particularly upset with a 1927 antimilitarist satirical cartoon published by Sartre and Georges Canguilhem in the University revue. In the same year he was finally led to resign after a media prank by Sartre and his comrades. In 1927 Lanson's working library of approximately 11,000 volumes was sold to Duke University, in Durham, North Carolina for a sum of 125,000 francs.

Lanson's reputation, particularly in the United States, steadily declined in the years after his death, reaching its nadir in the late 1950s and 1960s. In the era of the New Criticism, with its interest in the exploration of metaphor and image and the distancing of a text from the circumstances that created it, Lanson was seen as a pedant obsessed with historical and biological trivia and a rigid and unliterary philology. In recent years, however, with critics exploring possible commonalities between formal and historical methods and with more intense and less teleological studies of the history of criticism, interest in Lanson has grown.

== Works ==
- Le Théâtre Classique au Temps d’Alexandre Hardy (1891).
- Bossuet (1891).
- Boileau (1892).
- Histoire de la Littérature Française (with Paul Tuffrau, 1894).
- Hommes et Livres: Études Morales et Littéraires (1896).
- Corneille (1898).
- Études Pratiques de Composition Française (1898).
- Les Grands Maîtres et les Grands Courants de la Littérature Française Moderne (1900).
- Choix de Lettres du XVIIe Siècle (1901).
- L'Université et la Société Moderne (1902).
- Les Origines du Drame Contemporain. Nivelle de La Chaussée et la Comédie Larmoyante (1903).
- L’Art de la Prose (1909).
- Choix de Lettres du XVIIIe Siècle (1909).
- Extraits des Philosophes du XVIIIe Siècle (1909).
- Manuel Bibliographique de la Littérature Française Moderne, 1500–1900 (1909–1912).
- Trois Mois d'Enseignement aux États-Unis (1912).
- Conseils sur l’Art d’Écrire (1913).
- Anthologie des Poètes Nouveaux (1913).
- Esquisse d’une Histoire de la Tragédie Française (1920).
- Manuel Illustré d'Histoire de la Littérature Française (2 vol., 1923).
- Voltaire: Lettres Philosophiques (2 vol., 1924).
- Méthodes de l’Histoire Littéraire (1925).
- Les Essais de Montaigne. Étude et Analyse (1929).
- Le Marquis de Vauvenargues (1930).
- Les Essais de Montaigne: Étude et Analyse (1930).
- Voltaire: Extraits (1930).
- Montesquieu (1932).
- Lettres Choisies des XVIIe et XVIIIe Siècles (1932).

Translated into English

- Problems of National Education (1900).
- "The New Poetry in France," The International Quarterly, Vol. 4 (1901).
- "Historic Method of Jules Michelet," The International Quarterly, Vol. 11 (1905).
- "France of Today," The North American Review, Vol. 195 (1912).
- "Address before the American Academy and Institute," The Art World, Vol. 1, No. 5 (1917).
- "The Modern Subjects in Secondary Education." In: French Educational Ideals of Today (1919).
- "Molière and Farce," The Tulane Drama Review, Vol. 8, No. 2 (1963).
  - Moliere: A Collection of Critical Essays (ed. Jacques Guicharnaud, 1964).
- Voltaire (1966).
- "Literary History and Sociology," PMLA, Vol. 110, No. 2 (1995).
