= Marcel Dubois =

French geographer

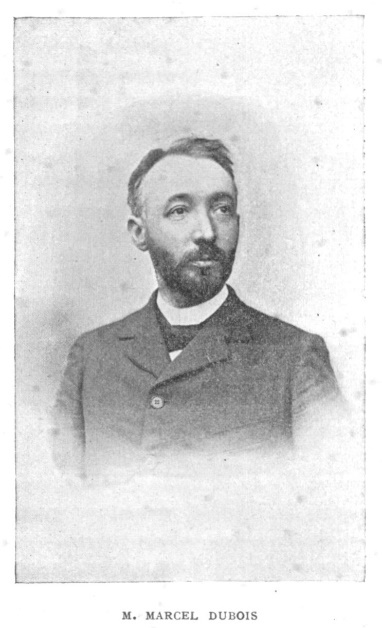
- Portrait from the Bulletin de la société normande de géographie, 1897
- Born: 25 July 1856; Paris, France
- Died: 23 October 1916 (aged 60); Romilly-sur-Andelle, Eure, France
- Occupation: Geographer

Marcel Dubois (25 July 1856 – 23 October 1916) was a French geographer. He was a co-founder of the Annales de Géographie, a journal of academic geography.

== Early years ==
Marcel Dubois was born in Paris on 25 July 1856. He attended the École normale supérieure at rue d'Ulm, Paris, from 1876. His schoolmates included the future geographers Bertrand Auerbach and Paul Dupuy, and the future historians Georges Lacour-Gayet, Salomon Reinach and Gustave Lanson. After graduating, he travelled to Athens in 1880, probably via Rome. He travel through Greece and the Aegean Islands and examined and copied many inscriptions, which were published in the bulletin de correspondence hellénique between 1880 and 1884. Dubois returned to France in the fall of 1882 with the material for his thesis on the island of Kos.

Dubois's first post was at the Faculty of Arts at the University of Nancy, which he joined in 1882 to teach ancient history. He joined the local geographical society, and from February 1884 to October 1885 was a lecturer in both history and geography. He then replaced Alfred Nicolas Rambaud as professor of history and geography, despite not yet having his doctorate, which he presented on 3 November 1884. In the summer of 1884 Dubois visited the coast of Asia Minor, and went on to the Mediterranean coast of Libya and Egypt.

== University of Paris ==
On 13 October 1883 Dubois became a lecturer in Geography at the Faculty of Letters, University of Paris. The geography section at the Sorbonne was inaugurated at the start of the 1891 academic year. In 1891 Dubois and Paul Vidal de La Blache founded the Annales de Géographie, a journal. A chair of colonial geography was finally established at the University of Paris on 16 May 1893, with Dubois as first professor, a position he held until his death. In 1895 Dubois was appointed to the advisory committee of public instruction of the colonies, and was made a knight of the Legion of Honour. Dubois broke with La Blache and stopped contributing to the Annales. in 1895.

The Ligue de la patrie française originated in 1898 with three young academics, Louis Dausset, Gabriel Syveton and Henri Vaugeois, who wanted to show that Dreyfusism was not accepted by all at the University. They launched a petition that attacked Émile Zola and what many saw as an internationalist, pacifist left-wing conspiracy. Charles Maurras gained the interest of the writer Maurice Barrès, and the movement gained the support of three eminent personalities: the geographer Marcel Dubois, the poet François Coppée and the critic and literature professor Jules Lemaître.

Marcel Dubois died in Romilly-sur-Andelle, Eure, on 23 October 1916.

== Selected works ==
- Dubois, M; Hauvette-Besnault A. (1881), "Inscriptions de l'île de Cos", Bulletin de Correspondance Hellénique, 5 (1): 201–240, doi:10.3406/bch.1881.4255
- Dubois, M (1884), De Insula Co, Paris: Berger-Levrault
- Dubois, M (1884), Notions élémentaires de géographie générale, Paris: G. Masson
- Dubois, M (1885), Les Ligues étolienne et achéenne. Leur histoire et leurs institutions, nature et durée de leur antagonisme, bibliothèque des Écoles françaises d’Athènes et de Rome, vol. fascicule 40, Paris: Ernest Thorin
- Dubois, M (1886), 'Géographie de l'Europe, Paris: G. Masson
- Dubois, M (1887), Géographie de la France. Géographie physique, géographie historique, politique et économique, éléments de géographie coloniale, Paris: G. Masson
- Dubois, M (1888), "L'avenir de l'enseignement géographique", Revue internationale de l'enseignement, XV: 449–477
- Dubois, M (1888), Géographie générale de l'Europe : cours de géographie pour l'enseignement secondaire spécial, Paris: G. Masson
- Dubois, M (1890), Précis de la Géographie économique des cinq parties du monde, Paris: G. Masson
- Dubois, M; Parmentier A. (1891), 'Géographie générale du monde, Europe, Asie, Afrique, Océanie, Amérique, étude spéciale du bassin de la Méditerranée, classe de Sixième, Paris: G. Masson
- Dubois, M (1891), "Strabon et Polybe", REG, 4 (16): 343–356, doi:10.3406/reg.1891.7445
- Dubois, M (1891), Examen de la géographie de Strabon, Paris: Armand Colin
- Dubois, M; Vidal de la Blache P. (dir) (1891), "Avis au lecteur", Annales de géographie, 1 (1): 3–6
- Dubois, M; Thalamas A. (1891), Géographie élémentaire des cinq parties du monde, classe de huitième, Paris: G. Masson
- Dubois, M (1891), "Océanographie et Océanie. I. Progrès les plus récents de notre connaissance de l'Océanie", Annales de géographie, 1 (1): 81–101, doi:10.3406/geo.1892.18051
- Dubois, M (1891), "Le rôle des articulations littorales : étude de géographie comparée", Annales de géographie, 1 (2): 131–142, doi:10.3406/geo.1892.18057
- Dubois, M (1892), Géographie de la France et de ses colonies, Paris: G. Masson
- Dubois, M (1892), "L'hydrographie des eaux douces. Méthodes employées pour l'étudier : recherche d'une meilleure classification I", Annales de géographie, 2 (5): 1–10, doi:10.3406/geo.1892.7378
- Dubois, M (1894), "Leçon d'ouverture du cours de géographie coloniale", Annales de géographie, 10: 121–137
- Dubois, M (1895), Systèmes coloniaux et peuples colonisateurs. Dogmes et faits, Paris: Plon
- Dubois, M. (April–May 1914), "Géographie et géographes (à propos d'une thèse)", Le Correspondant, 2: 833–863

== Sources ==
- Conner, Tom (2014-04-24), The Dreyfus Affair and the Rise of the French Public Intellectual, McFarland, ISBN 978-0-7864-7862-0
- Ginsburger, Nicolas (2017), "Des îles grecques à la géographie coloniale : Marcel Dubois à la conquête de la Sorbonne (1876-1895)", Cybergeo: European Journal of Geography (in French)
- Marcel Dubois (1856-1916), BnF: Bibliotheque nationale de France
- Pierrard, Pierre (1998), Les Chrétiens et l'affaire Dreyfus, Editions de l'Atelier, ISBN 978-2-7082-3390-4
- Ginsburger, Nicolas (2018), "La Belle Époque d'un géographe colonial : Marcel Dubois, universitaire et figure publique, entre Affaire Dreyfus et Entente cordiale (1894-1905)", Cybergeo: European Journal of Geography (in French)
