= Jules Lemaître =

French critic and dramatist (1853–1914)

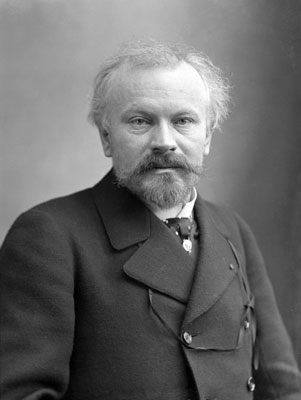
- Born: François Élie Jules Lemaître; 27 April 1853; Vennecy, French Empire
- Died: 4 August 1914 (aged 61); Tavers, France
- Occupations: Literary critic, and author

Signature
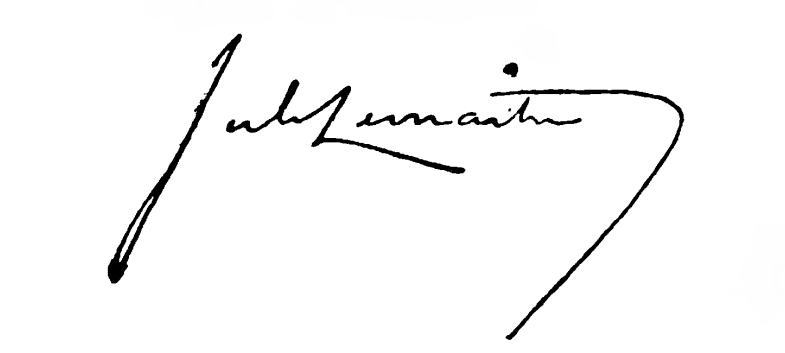

François Élie Jules Lemaître (27 April 1853 – 4 August 1914) was a French critic and dramatist.

== Biography ==
Lemaître was born in Vennecy, Loiret. He became a professor at the University of Grenoble in 1883, but was already well known for his literary criticism, and in 1884 he resigned his position to devote his time to literature. Lemaître succeeded Jean-Jacques Weiss as drama critic of the Journal des Débats, and subsequently filled the same office on the Revue des Deux Mondes. His literary studies were collected under the title of Les Contemporains (7 series, 1886–99), and his dramatic feuilletons as Impressions de Théàtre (10 series, 1888–98).

Lemaître's sketches of modern authors show great insight and unexpected judgment as well as gaiety and originality of expression. He was admitted to the French Academy on 16 January 1896. Lemaître's political views were defined in La Campagne Nationaliste (1902), lectures delivered in the provinces by him and by Godefroy Cavaignac.

Lemaître conducted a nationalist campaign in the Écho de Paris, and was for some time president of the Ligue de la Patrie Française. The Ligue originated in 1898 with three young academics, Louis Dausset, Gabriel Syveton and Henri Vaugeois, who wanted to show that Dreyfusism was not accepted by all at the university. They launched a petition that attacked Émile Zola and what many saw as an internationalist, pacifist left-wing conspiracy. Charles Maurras gained the interest of the writer Maurice Barrès, and the movement gained the support of three eminent personalities: the geographer Marcel Dubois, the poet François Coppée and the critic and Jules Lemaître.

Lemaître resigned from the Ligue de la Patrie Française 1904, and dedicated the rest of his life to writing. He died in Tavers, aged 61.

== Publications ==
Non-fiction

- La Comédie après Molière et le Théâtre de Dancourt (1882).
- Quomodo Cornelius Noster Aristotelis Poeticam sit Interpretatus (1882).
- Les Contemporains. Études et Portraits Littéraires (7 vols., 1886–1899; 8th vol. posthumous).
- Corneille et la Poétique d'Aristote (1888).
- Impressions de Théâtre (10 vols., 1888–1898).
- L'Imagier, Études et Portraits Contemporains (1892).
- Jean-Jacques Rousseau (1907).
- Jean Racine (1908).
- Fénelon (1910).
- Châteaubriand (1912).
- Les Péchés de Sainte-Beuve (1913).

Theater

- Révoltée (1889).
- Le Député Leveau (1890).
- Mariage Blanc (1891).
- Flipote (1893).
- Le Pardon (1895).
- L'Âge Difficile (1895).
- La Bonne Hélène (1896).
- L'Aînée (1898).
- Bertrade (1905).
- La Massière (1905).
- Le Mariage de Télémaque (1910).
- Kismet (1912).
- Un Salon (1924, posthumous).

Poetry

- Les Médaillons (1880).
- Petites Orientales (1883).

Miscellaneous

- Sérénus, Histoire d'un Martyr. Contes d'Autrefois et d'Aujourd'hui (1886).
- Dix Contes (1890).
- Les Rois (1893).
- Myrrha, Vierge et Martyre (1894).
- La Franc-maçonnerie (1899).
- Contes Blancs: la Cloche; la Chapelle Blanche; Mariage Blanc (1900).
- En Marge des Vieux Livres (1905–1907).
- Discours Royalistes, 1908–1911 (1911).
- La Vieillesse d'Hélène. Nouveaux Contes en Marge (1914).

Works in English translation

- The Eldest: Comedy in Four Acts (189–?).
- "A Modern 'Morality'," The Living Age (1897).
- "The Snobs." In: The Universal Anthology (1899).
- Jean Jacques Rousseau (1907).
- Their Majesties the Kings (1909).
- Forgiveness: A Play in Three Acts (1913).
- "The Pardon." In: Three Modern Plays from the French (1914).
- A Modern Book of Criticism (1919).
  - "The Criticism of Contemporaries," pp. 15–19.
  - "Personality in Criticism," pp. 20–23.
  - "Tradition and Love," pp. 23–25.
- Serenus and Other Stories of the Past and Present (1920).
- Literary Impressions (1921).
- "Princess Mimi," The Living Age (1921).
- Theatrical Impressions (1924).
- On the Margins of Old Books (1929).

== Quotations ==
- "There are a thousand ways of seeing the same object."
- "The body has a character as complex and as difficult to comprehend as the moral character whereof it is the translation and the symbol."
- "Happiness is so fragile that one risks the loss of it by talking of it.

== Sources ==
- Conner, Tom (2014-04-24), The Dreyfus Affair and the Rise of the French Public Intellectual, McFarland, ISBN 978-0-7864-7862-0
- Pierrard, Pierre (1998), Les Chrétiens et l'affaire Dreyfus, Editions de l'Atelier, ISBN 978-2-7082-3390-4
