= Gaston Méry =

French journalist and author (1866–1909)

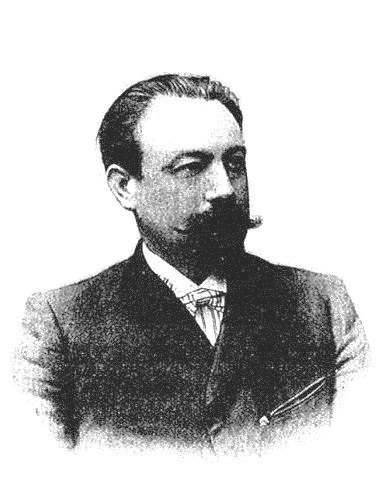
- Méry from L'Écho du merveilleux, n° 302, 1 August 1909
- Born: 20 April 1866; Sens, France
- Died: 15 July 1909 (aged 43); Paris, France
- Occupation: Journalist

Gaston Méry (20 April 1866 – 15 July 1909) was a French author, translator and journalist. He was violently antisemitic and was also hostile to the people of the south of France, whom he saw as racially impure and inferior Latin peoples compared to the Celts of the north. He founded a journal L'écho du merveilleux which was largely devoted to proving the reality of a series of visions of the Virgin Mary, Joan of Arc and Jesus reported by Marie Martel in Calvados. From 1900 until his death he was a member of the Paris municipal council.

== Life ==
Gaston Méry was born in Sens on 20 April 1866, son of a merchant. He completed his classical studies in Sens. After his military service he began to study law, but abandoned this when his parents were financially ruined. He moved to Paris and found work as a maitre répétiteur (teaching assistant) at the École Monge, where he spent three years. In 1889 he published L'école où l'on s'amuse, in which he criticized the English system of education. While teaching he took courses at the Faculty of Law, and was licensed in 1889. The next year he was appointed copywriter at the Public Assistance, where he worked until 20 April 1891 when he resigned to become editor of the Libre Parole.

=== Journalism ===
Gaston Méry joined the daily newspaper La Libre Parole shortly after it was launched by Édouard Drumont. (Note: Drumont had edited the 800-page France juive (Jewish France) in 1886.) He was soon made editor in chief due to his skill in exploiting scandalous affairs and his daring invective. Méry remained with the Libre Parole until his death in 1909. The newspaper, with its motto "France for the French", was aggressively antisemitic. Méry's violent polemics often resulted in duels and lawsuits. In 1895 he was tried at the Assize Court for having accused Mr. Paul Strauss, Paris city councilor, of having sold his vote. He was acquitted by the Jury of the Seine. His fought well-publicized duels with Émile Gustave Laffon, Governor of New Caledonia, Dr. Ward, physician of the Mizon mission, M. Rogier, Adolphe Possien and the Prince de la Moskowa. He defended Jean-Baptiste Bidegain^{(fr)} in La Libre Parole when Bidegain was attacked by the media during the Affaire des fiches (1904–05).

Marguerite Durand's newspaper La Fronde refused to donate money to a fund sponsored by La Libre Parole for the widow of Colonel Hubert-Joseph Henry, who had forged the papers used in the trial of Alfred Dreyfus. La Libre Parole then made a series of attacks on Durand's character, accusing her of being a bad mother and a prostitute. Méry claimed she had turned away an old friend from her days as an actress, implying that she wanted to forget this aspect of her past. Durand sued the paper in December 1898. When Bradamante wrote in La Fronde that subscribing to the Henry fund would be to pay homage to a criminal, Méry countered that the frondeuses would not "'come to the aid of a mother in tears with her baby." He wrote that La Fronde was being funded by the same Jewish association that was paying to overturn the Dreyfus trial decision and to destroy the French nation.

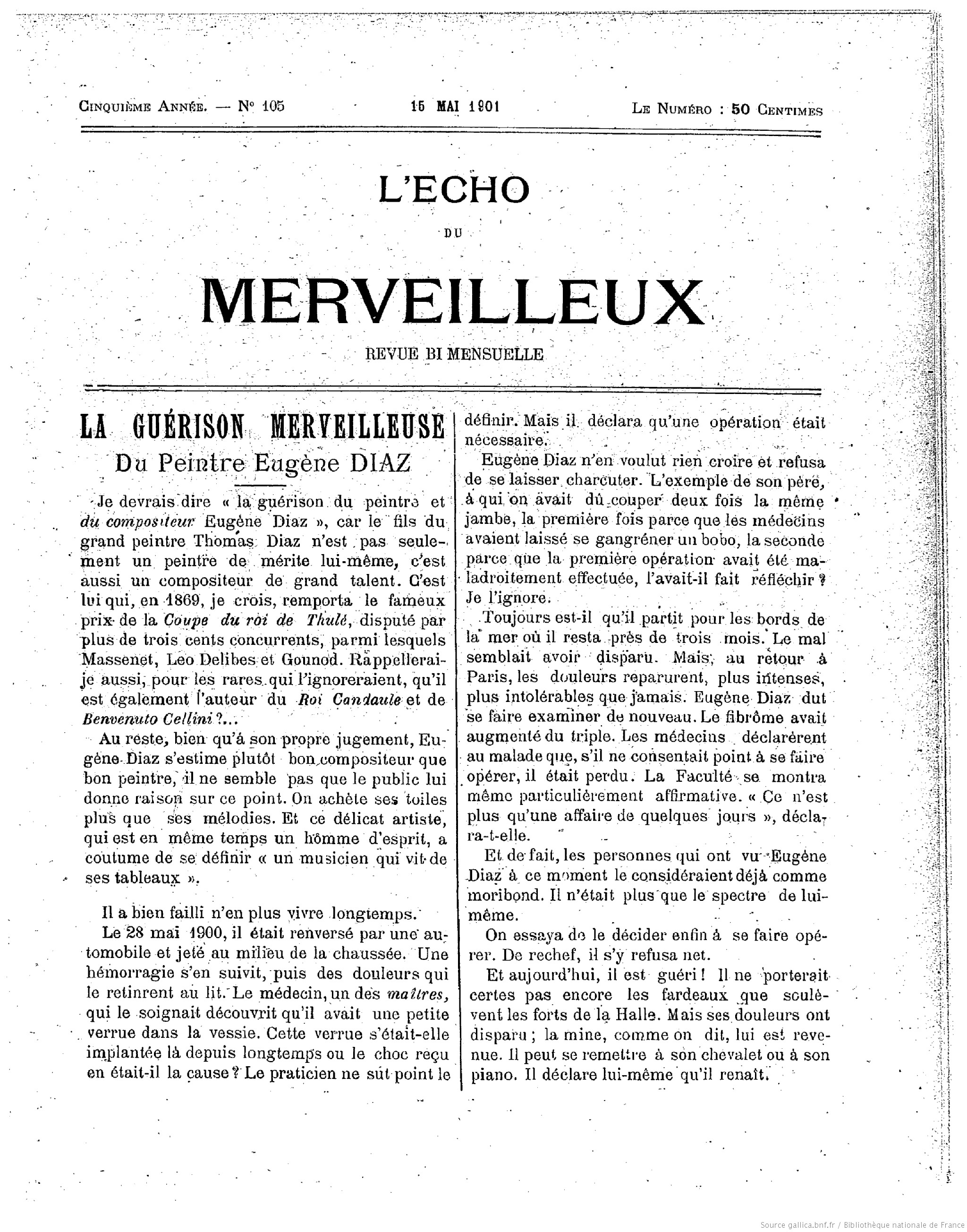
L'écho du merveilleux 15 May 1901

Méry was initiated into the Martinist Order in the third degree by "Papus" (Gérard Encausse) on December 18, 1894. In 1897 he founded the review L'écho du merveilleux. This journal, published between 1897 and 1909, met the demand for rational discussion of the occult. It rapidly gained a large circulation. It devoted many of its issues to proving the veracity of the visions of the child Marie Martel at Tilly-sur-Seulles. It alleged that the words of the Virgin were identical to those pronounced at Lourdes. (Note: On 18 March 1896 Marie Martel had a vision at Tilly-sur-Seulles, near to Caen in Calvados, in which the Virgin Mary appeared to her in a white robe with a blue belt. Three nuns and fifty children, their pupils, also said they saw the vision. The first evening Martel saw an immense and magnificent basilica which nobody else could see except as reflections in Martel's eyes. After that only Martel saw the Virgin, who regularly reappeared until 1905. Joan of Arc also appeared very often, and on 8 December 1900 Martel saw Jesus, who confirmed to Martel the revelations he had made to Margaret Mary Alacoque at Paray-le-Monial. On 8 December 1901 the Virgin told Martel that there was a crisis in the church, and a large part of the clergy would be struck by divine wrath for having trampled on her words. The Catholic Church gave qualified recognition to Martel's visions in 1896-99.) Méry tried to make a portrait of the Holy Family from the words of the little seer, and tried to create the plans of the basilica from her words. Méry wrote several pamphlets on Mysticism and Occultism, of which Apparitions de Tilly: la Voyante de la rue de Paradis sold 224,000 copies.

=== Racism ===
Gaston Méry told the Comité Nationale Antijuif that, just as Cato the Elder had always said "Carthage must be destroyed", "I end by telling you, we must destroy the Jews." Méry published his novel Jean Révolte at Dentu in 1892, with a main character modelled on Drumont. In this novel he expounded a new and very personal theory he called le Racisme. The difference is that while Dumont hated Jews, Révolte hated southerners, and felt that only in the north was the Gallic blood pure. Behind the southerner, Jean Révolte immediately discovers the Jew: "If under the Greek we discover the Aryan, by scratching the Latin we find the Semite". In his racial theory, although the French nobility was German and the bourgeoisie was Latin, the common people of northern France were purely Celtic. Mery wrote:

Our forebears destroyed the Bastille, which was then the symbol of oppression; we will bring down the Bourse, which symbolises oppression today. They drove out the aristocrats and priests; we will chase away the shady dealers of finance and politics. We will show the people that the Revolution profited only the Midi, where it started; that only the Latins and the Jews gain any benefit from it, and that it must be fought again because it did nothing to give us our freedom, but only replaced our masters. The ousted nobles were succeeded by the Jacobins, the Church by Freemasonry. Who would dare maintain that we have gained by the change?

=== Politics ===
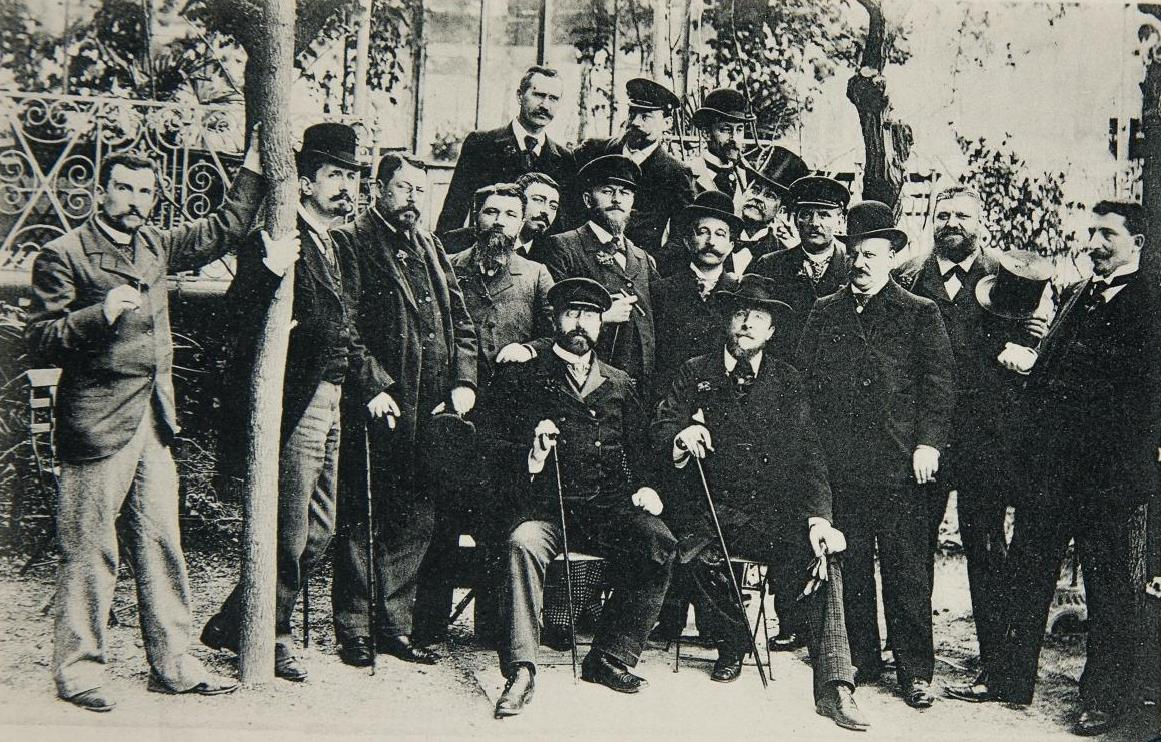
Nationalist Paris municipal councillors in May 1900. Méry is in the rear, center, wearing an officer's cap.

Gaston Méry was a municipal councilor in Paris from 1900 to 1909. During the May 1900 municipal elections the Nationalists won 50 of the 80 seats on the Paris Municipal Council. Méry was one of the 24 Nationalists who had no other political allegiance. Mery was supported by Drumont's Ligue antisémitique de France and also by the Patrie Française and Ligue des Patriotes, but not by Rochéfort's Parti Républicain Socialiste Français. Méry was elected in the first round on 6 May 1900 for the Faubourg Montmartre constituency as city councillor and general councillor of the Seine.

The victorious Nationalists ordered the removal of Urbain Gohier's books from the city libraries, which they considered to be unpatriotic insults to the army, to be replaced with Méry's Loubet la Honte (Loubet the Disgrace). Loubet-la-Honte (1900) was a violent attack on Émile Loubet, President of France, and caused a considerable stir. Méry wanted to base his political action on direct contact with the divine word, particularly during the Dreyfus affair. He joined the Republican-nationalist-anti-Semitic group, and was made a member of the Committee of Public Assistance.

During the 1904 municipal elections Méry spoke in Paris to a meeting of 5,000 nationalist members of the Ligue des Patriotes and the Patrie française. He praised Drumont, François Coppée and Victor Henri Rochefort, none of whom had been invited to the meeting, and urged the attendees to support Drumont's PLA. However, Gabriel Syveton called on the audience to have nothing to do with Drumont or anyone, such as Méry, connected to La Libre Parole. In his view antisemitism was damaging to the Patrie Française, and the party's candidates in the council elections should avoid the subject. The slogan "Down with the Jews" should not be used at the election rallies.

Gaston Méry died in Paris on 15 July 1909.

== Publications ==
Publications by Gaston Méry include:

- Gaston Méry (1890), L'école où l'on s'amuse (roman parisien), Paris: A. Savine, p. 322
- Gaston Méry (1892), Jean Révolte, roman de lutte, Paris: E. Dentu
- Gaston Méry (1896), La voyante de la rue de Paradis et les apparitions de Tilly-sur-Seulles, Paris: E. Dentu
- Gaston Méry (1896), La voyante et les maisons hantées, Paris: E. Dentu
- Gaston Méry (1896), La voyante et ses détracteurs : nouveaux prodiges dans le Calvados, Paris: E. Dentu
- Bon de Novaye (1896), Ce qui va nous arriver. Guerre et révolution d'après 45 prophéties anciennes et modernes, preface by Gaston Méry, Paris: Chamuel, p. 155
- Gaston Méry (1899), Loubet-la-Honte, vol. I. Son caractère, ses débuts, sa fortune, Paris: librairie antisémite
- Gaston Méry (1900), Loubet-la-Honte, vol. II. Les conventions scélérates. Le Panama. Dreyfus, Paris: librairie antisémite
- Gaston Méry, Un complot maçonnique. La Vérité sur Diana Vaughan, Paris: Blériot

== Sources ==
- Bertin, Francis (1993), Prophétisme et politique (in French), L'AGE D'HOMME, ISBN 978-2-8251-0574-0
- Bidegain, Jean-Baptiste (1905), Le Grand-Orient de France. Sa Doctrine et ses Actes (in French), Paris: Librairie antisémite
- Cabanel, Patrick; Vallez, Mariline (April 2000), "La haine du Midi : l'antiméridionalisme dans la France de la Belle Epoque" (PDF), CTHS (in French), France
- Curinier, C.-E., ed. (1899–1919), "MERY (Gaston)", Dictionnaire national des contemporains : contenant les notices des membres de l'Institut de France, du gouvernement et du parlement français, de l'Académie de médecine (in French), vol. 2, Paris: Office général d'éd. de librairie et d'impr. – via Gallica
- Fuller, Robert Lynn (2012-04-19), The Origins of the French Nationalist Movement, 1886–1914, McFarland, ISBN 978-0-7864-9025-7
- Gaston Méry (1866-1909) (in French), BnF: Bibliotheque nationale de France
- Leveillard, Daniel (2012), SOMMES-NOUS À LA FIN D'UN TEMPS?: (La part de merveilleux dans l'Histoire) (in French), Osmora Inc., ISBN 978-2-89728-001-7
- Maunder, Chris (2016-02-18), Our Lady of the Nations: Apparitions of Mary in 20th-Century Catholic Europe, OUP Oxford, ISBN 978-0-19-106675-7
- Raczynski, Richard (2009), Un dictionnaire du Martinisme (in French), Paris: Dualpha éd.
- Roberts, Mary Louise (2017-03-15), Disruptive Acts: The New Woman in Fin-de-Siecle France, University of Chicago Press, ISBN 978-0-226-36075-1
- Seillan, Jean-Marie (2003), "Nord contre Sud. Visages de l'antiméridionalisme dans la littérature française de la fin du XIXe siècle", Loxias (in French), 1, archived from the original on 2021-09-22
- Tombs, Robert (2003-09-02), Nationhood and Nationalism in France: From Boulangism to the Great War 1889-1918, Routledge, ISBN 978-1-134-99796-1
