= François Coppée =

French poet and novelist (1842–1908)

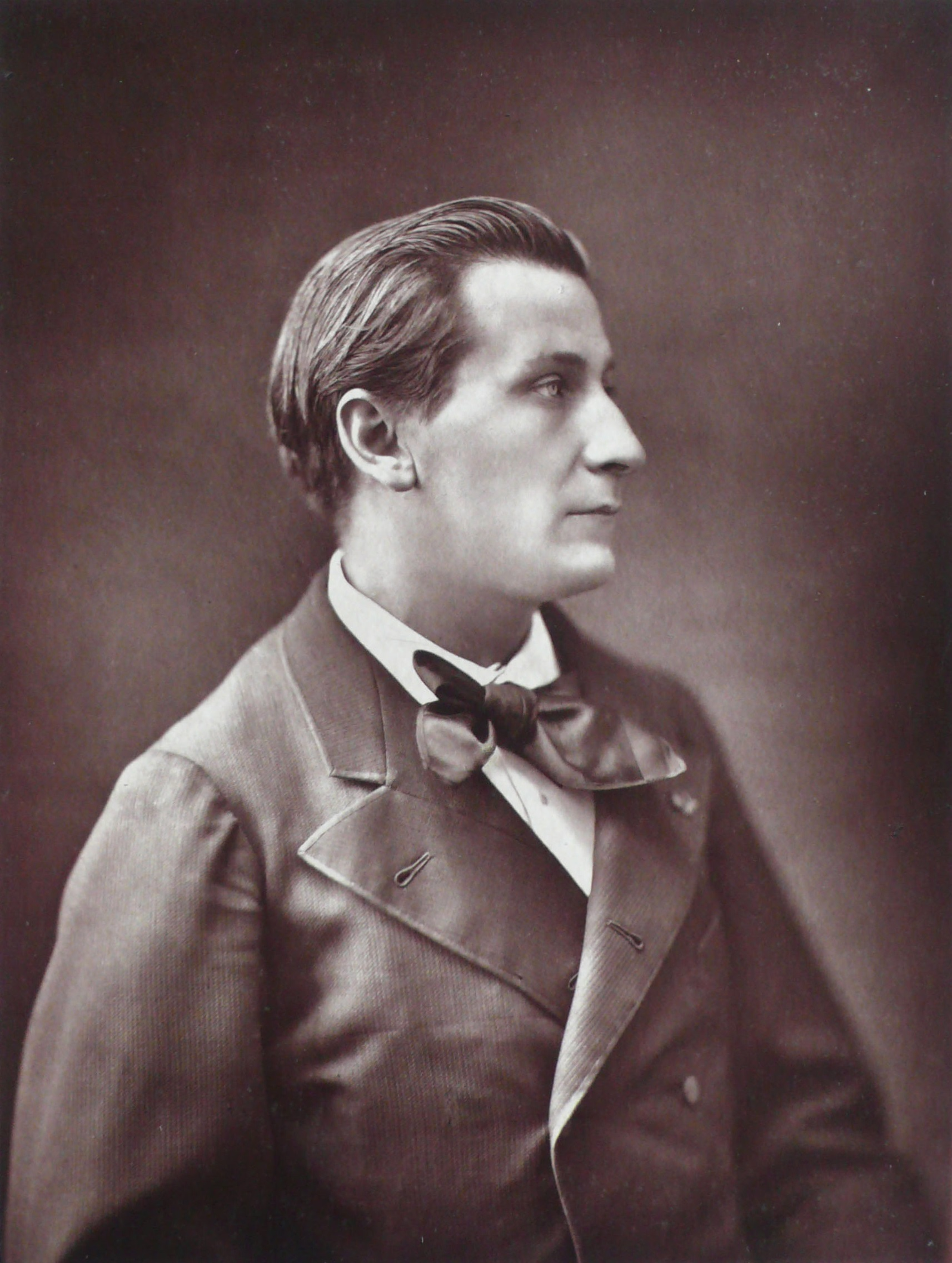
- François Coppée by Nadar, c. 1880
- Born: François Édouard Joachim Coppée; 26 January 1842; Paris, France
- Died: 23 May 1908 (aged 66); Paris, France
- Resting place: Montparnasse Cemetery, Paris
- Occupation: Writer

Signature
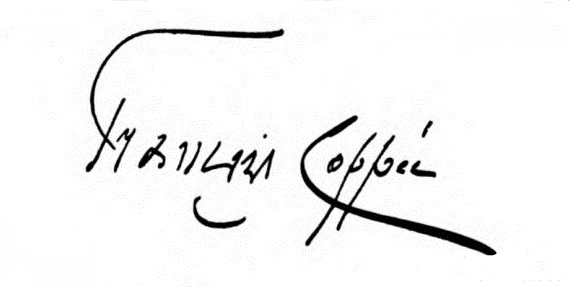

François Édouard Joachim Coppée (French pronunciation: [fʁɑ̃swa ədwaʁ ʒɔakim kɔpe]; 26 January 1842 – 23 May 1908) was a French poet and novelist.

== Biography ==
Coppée was born in Paris to a civil servant. After attending the Lycée Saint-Louis he became a clerk in the ministry of war and won public favour as a poet of the Parnassian school. His first printed verses date from 1864. In 1869, his "Poèmes modernes" (among others La Grève de forgerons) were quite successful. In the same year, Coppée's first play, Le Passant, starring Sarah Bernhardt and Madame Agar, was received with approval at the Odéon theatre, and later Fais ce que dois (1871) and Les Bijoux de la délivrance (1872), short poetic dramas inspired by the Franco-Prussian War, were applauded.

After holding a post in the library of the senate, Coppée was chosen in 1878 as archivist of the Comédie Française, an office he held till 1884. In that year, his election to the Académie française caused him to retire from all public appointments. He was made an officer of the Legion of Honour in 1888.

Coppée was famed as le poète des humbles (the poet of the humble). His verse and prose focus on plain expressions of emotion, patriotism, the joy of young love, and the pitifulness of the poor. Coppée continued to write plays, mostly serious dramas in verse, two of which were composed in collaboration with Armand d'Artois. The performance of a short episode of the Commune, Le Pater, was prohibited by the government in 1889. Coppée published his first prose work in 1875 and went on to publish short stories, an autobiography of his youth, a series of short articles on miscellaneous subjects, and La Bonne Souffrance, a popular account of his reconversion to the Roman Catholic Church. His conversion was due to a severe illness which twice brought him close to death.

Coppée was also interested in public affairs, joining the most violent section of the Nationalist movement (while remaining contemptuous of the apparatus of democracy) and taking a leading part against Alfred Dreyfus in the Dreyfus affair. He was one of the founders of the Ligue de la patrie française, which originated in 1898 with three young academics, Louis Dausset, Gabriel Syveton and Henri Vaugeois, who wanted to show that Dreyfusism was not accepted by all at the university. They launched a petition that attacked Émile Zola and what many saw as an internationalist, pacifist left-wing conspiracy. Charles Maurras gained the interest of the writer Maurice Barrès, and the movement gained the support of three eminent personalities: the geographer Marcel Dubois, the poet François Coppée and the critic and literature professor Jules Lemaître.

== Criticism ==
The poet Arthur Rimbaud, a young contemporary of Coppée, published numerous parodies of Coppée's poetry. Rimbaud's parodies were published in L'Album Zutique (in 1871? 1872?). Most of these poems parody the style ("chatty comfortable rhymes" that were "the delight of the enlightened bourgeois of the day") and form (alexandrine couplets arranged in ten line verses) of some short poems by Coppée. Rimbaud published them under the name François Coppée.

The poet Lautréamont cited his Grève de Forgerons in the list of the "penpushers" to be absolutely ignored (Poèsie, Part I).

== Works ==
=== Poetry ===
- Le Reliquaire (1866)
- Intimités (1867)
- Poémes modernes (among them: L'Angelus, Le Père, La Grève de forgerons) (1867-9)
- Les Humbles (1872)
- Le Cahier rouge (1874)
- Olivier (1875)
- L'Exilée (1876)
- Contes en vers (1881)
- Poèmes et récits (1886)
- Arrière-saison (1887)
- Paroles sincères (1890)
- Dans la prière et la lutte
- Vers français
- Salut, Petit Jesus

″Pour Toujours" (1892)

- A tes yeux

=== Plays ===
- Le Passant (1869) Translated into Portuguese by Alves Crespo (playwright, 1847–1907) as Sonho and published in 1905.
- Deux Douleurs (1870)
- Fais ce que Dois (1871)
- L'Abandonnée (1871)
- Les Bijoux de la Délivrance (1872)
- Le Rendez-Vous (1872)
- Prologue d'Ouverture pour les Matinées de la Gaîté (1874)
- Le Luthier de Crémone (1876)
- La Guerre de Cent Ans (1877)
- Le Tresor (1879)
- La Bataille d'Hernani (1880)
- La Maison de Molière (1880)
- Madame de Maintenon (1881)
- Severo Torelli (1883) Translated into Portuguese by Jaime Victor and Macedo Papança, Visconde de Monsaraz, and performed in Lisbon at the National Theatre in 1887. Published in the same year.
- Les Jacobites (1885)
- Le Pater (1889) Translated into Portuguese by Margarida de Sequeira as O Pater.
- Pour la couronne (1895) Translated into English by John Davidson as For the Crown and performed at the Lyceum Theatre, London, in 1896. For the Crown was performed at Covent Garden as a prize-winning opera The Cross and the Crescent with music by Colin McAlpin in 1903.

=== Prose works ===
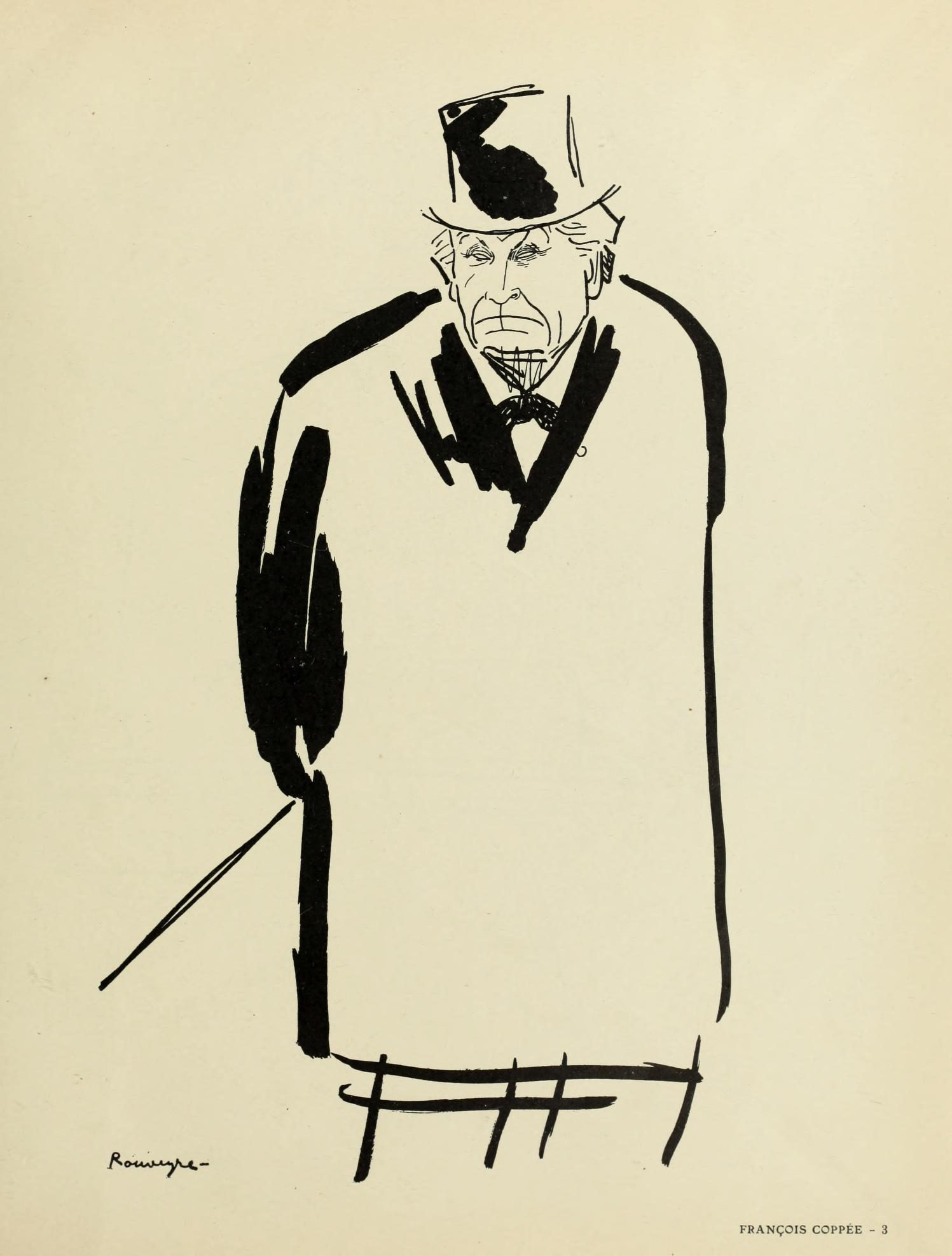
François Coppée, by André Rouveyre.

- Une Idylle pendant le siège (1874)
- Toute une jeunesse (1890)
- Les Vrais riches (1892)
- Le Coupable (1896). Translated into portuguese by Jorge de Abreu (1874–1932) as O criminoso (Lisboa: Empresa Lusitana, 356 p.; 16 cm.; col. Selecta)
- Mon franc-parler (1893–96) (articles)
- La Bonne Souffrance (1898)

=== Works in English translation ===
- (1890). Ten Tales.
- (1893). True Riches.
- (1894). Blessed Are the Poor.
- (1896). Coppée and Maupassant Tales.
- (1901). Tale for Christmas, and Other Seasons.
- (1905). A Romance of Youth.
- (1910). "A Piece of Bread," in International Short Stories.
- (1915). Pater Noster.
- (1915). "The Wounded Soldier in the Convent," in War Poems and Other Translations, by Lord Curzon.
- (1931). The Lord's Prayer.

== See also ==
- Orientalism

== Sources ==
- This article incorporates text from a publication now in the public domain: Chisholm, Hugh, ed. (1911). "Coppée, François Édouard Joachim". Encyclopædia Britannica. Vol. 7 (11th ed.). Cambridge University Press. pp. 101–102.
- Conner, Tom (2014-04-24), The Dreyfus Affair and the Rise of the French Public Intellectual, McFarland, ISBN 978-0-7864-7862-0
- Pierrard, Pierre (1998), Les Chrétiens et l'affaire Dreyfus, Editions de l'Atelier, ISBN 978-2-7082-3390-4
