= Albert Gauthier de Clagny =

French politician

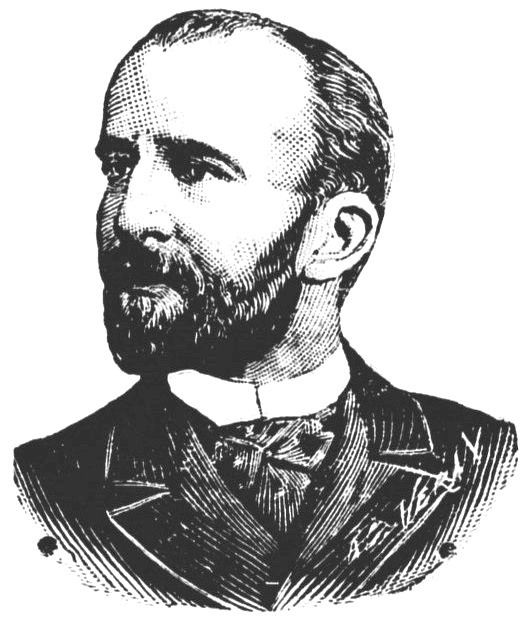
- M. Gauthier (de Clagny) 1904

Deputy for Seine-et-Oise
- In office 1889–1910

Personal details
- Born: 14 September 1853 Versailles, Seine-et-Oise, France
- Died: 16 December 1927 (aged 74) Paris, France
- Occupation: Politician

Albert Gauthier de Clagny (14 September 1853 – 16 December 1927) was a right-wing French politician during the period before World War I. He was a respected lawyer, a Bonapartist and an anti-Dreyfusard.

== Early years ==
Albert Gauthier de Clagny was born on 14 September 1853 in Versailles, Seine-et-Oise. He joined the cavalry for his military service. He then spent some years among workers in the north, the Pyrenees and in Italy, where he worked in quarries of hard marble. He turned to the study of the law, earned his doctorate in 1882 and in 1883 became an advocate to the Council of State and the Court of Cassation.

Gauthier de Clagny was a supporter of General Georges Ernest Boulanger, and a member of the steering committee of the republican plebiscite committees in 1883. In 1885 he was a supporter of the Bonapartist Appel au peuple, and spoke against parliamentarianism and in favor of a plebiscite and revision of the 1875 constitution. He remained true to these views throughout his political career, demanding revision of the constitution from each legislature. In 1886 he was elected general councilor of the canton of Sèvres in the southwest of Paris, and retained this office for the remainder of his life. In 1889 he joined the bar of the Court of Appeal of Paris. He was appointed head of the Journal de droit administratif.

== Political career ==
Gauthier de Clagny ran for election as a Deputy for the second district of Versailles in the national legislature on 22 September 1889 on the Parti National platform, and was elected on the first ballot. Gauthier de Clancy was respected for his legal expertise. He supported the Bonapartist and Nationalist causes. He was appointed to many committees and often spoke in the Chamber. He was against the tax on rent and in favor of protecting French labourers from foreign competition. He was reelected on the first ballot on 20 August 1893 and on 8 May 1898.

In 1897 Gauthier de Clagny became vice-president of the Ligue des Patriotes. He watched the evolution of the Dreyfus affair closely, and was indignant at the passivity of the government, particularly Jean-Baptiste Billot. The admissions by Colonel Hubert-Joseph Henry and his suicide were devastating to him. On 2 September 1898 he told a writer for Le Jour that "this completely changes things." After this he stayed silent and was no longer involved in the agitation.

On 27 April 1902 Gauthier de Clagny was reelected in the first round on the platform of the Républicaine Démocratique - Fédération Révisionniste alliance. Gabriel Syveton, treasurer of the Ligue de la patrie française, was elected deputy for the Seine in this election. In the Chamber of Deputies Syveton was appointed secretary of the nationalist and republican group. Others in the group were Godefroy Cavaignac and Gauthier de Clagny. Most of the League's activists abandoned the League in favor of Gauthier de Clagny's Républicains plébiscitaires or Jules Méline's Fédération républicaine.

Gauthier de Clagny was elected once more on 6 May 1906 in the first round. The draft law of 13 July 1906 that reinstated Dreyfus in the army was adopted without debate. Gauthier de Clagny was among the anti-Dreyfusards who abstained. After his term expired on 31 May 1910 he did not run for reelection. He died on 16 December 1927 in Paris.

== Publications ==
Albert Gauthier de Clagny was the author of many proposed laws and resolutions. Other publications included:

- Albert Gauthier de Clagny (1880), Du "Postliminium". De la Déclaration d'absence. Situation des biens de l'absent pendant la période d'envoi en possession provisoire. (thesis), Paris: F. Pichon et A. Cotillon
- Albert Gauthier de Clagny (1888), De la Validité du mariage des prêtres, Paris: France. Cour de cassation / L. Cerf
- Albert Gauthier de Clagny (1898), Une erreur judiciaire, Paris: A. Chevalier-Marescq et cie, éditeurs
- Albert Gauthier de Clagny (1923), "Un Semeur d'énergie. Paul Déroulède", Conférence donnée aux membres de la Ligue des patriotes et de la Société de graphologie, à Paris, le 17 mars 1923, sous la présidence de M. Charles Le Goffic, Paris: Société de graphologie

== Sources ==
- Albert Gauthier de Clagny (1853-1927) (in French), BnF: Bibliotheque nationale de France
- d'Appollonia, Ariane Chebel (1998-12-01), L'extrême-droite en France: De Maurras à Le Pen, Editions Complexe, ISBN 978-2-87027-764-5
- Fuller, Robert Lynn (2012-04-19), The Origins of the French Nationalist Movement, 1886–1914, McFarland, ISBN 978-0-7864-9025-7
- Jolly, Jean (1960), "Albert Gauthier de Clagny", Biographie extraite du dictionnaire des parlementaires français de 1889 à 1940 (in French), Assemblée Nationale
- Jolly, Jean (1977), "Gabriel Syveton", Dictionnaire des parlementaires français de 1889 à 1940, ISBN 2-1100-1998-0
- Joly, Bertrand (April–June 1994), "Les antidreyfusards croyaient-ils Dreyfus coupable ?", Revue Historique (in French), 291 (2 (590)), Presses Universitaires de France: 401–437, JSTOR 40955761
