= Louis André =

French politician (1838–1913)

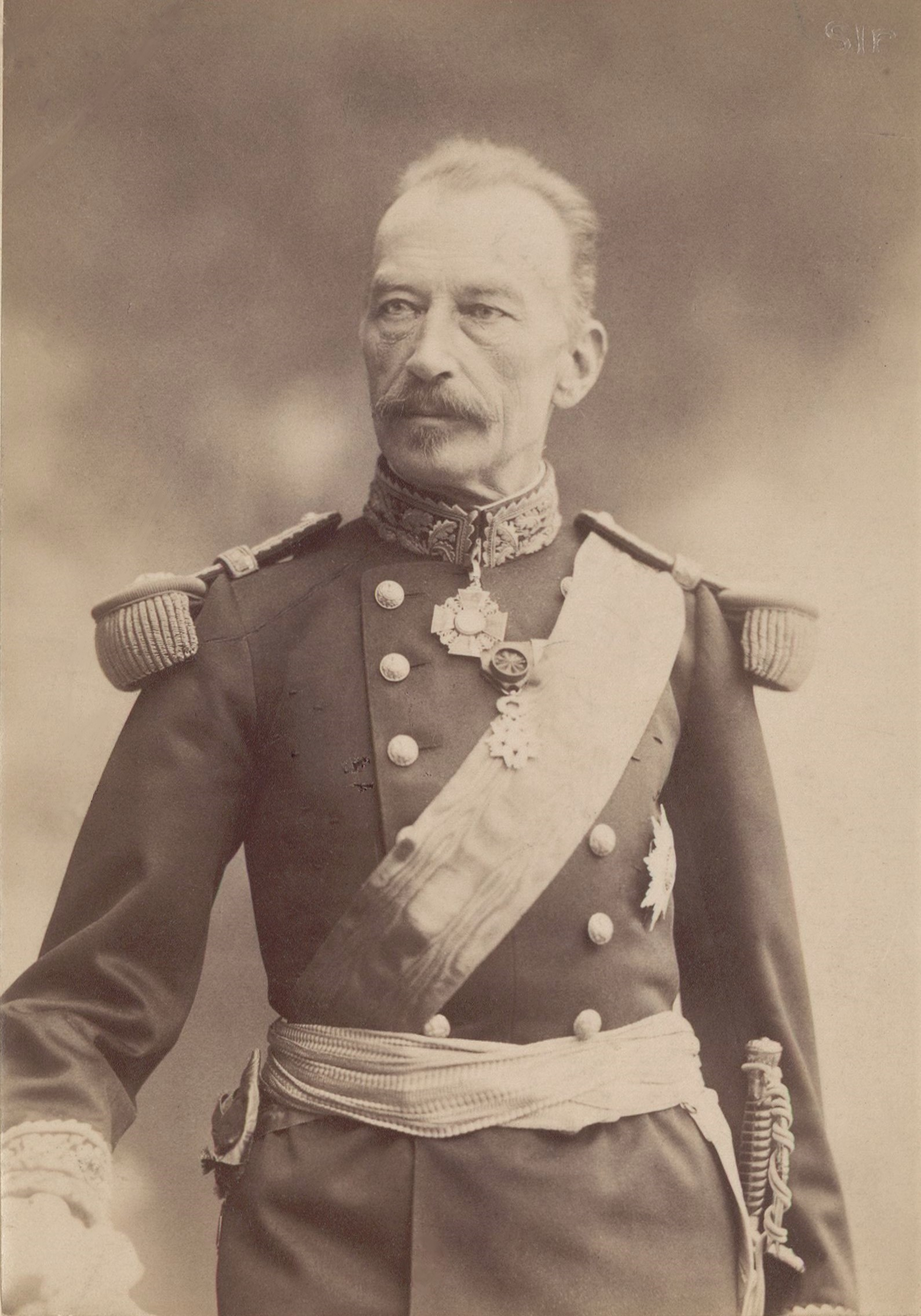
Louis André, circa 1900

Louis Joseph Nicolas André (28 March 1838, Nuits-Saint-Georges, Côte-d'Or – 18 March 1913, Dijon) was France's Minister of War from 1900 until 1904. A Freemason and fiercely loyal to the Third Republic, he was militantly anti-Catholic and anticlerical. He was the instigator of the Affaire Des Fiches, a scandal in which he received reports from Masonic groups on which army officers were practicing Catholics for the purpose of denying their promotions.

In 1876 Louis André married the opera singer Marguerite Chapuy, who had created the role of Micaëla in the premiere run of Bizet's Carmen in March 1875.

== Affair des Fiches ==
According to Piers Paul Read, "The information, as it came in, was entered on cards or fiches. These would be marked either Corinth or Carthage -- the Corinthians being the sheep who should be promoted and the Carthaginians, the goats who should be held back. An officer reported to be 'perfect in all respects; excellent opinions,' would be marked as a Corinthian: another who, 'though a good officer, well reported on, takes no part in politics,' would nonetheless be designated a Carthaginian because he, 'went to Mass with his family,' and sent his six children to Catholic schools. A bachelor officer who went to Mass was by definition of a reactionary disposition. Officers loyal to the republican ideals were encouraged to report the opinions voiced by their colleagues in the mess."

In 1904, Jean Bidegain, the assistant Secretary of Grand Orient de France, secretly sold a selection of the Fiches to Gabriel Syveton of the Ligue de la Patrie Francaise for 40,000 francs. The resulting scandal led directly to the resignation of French Prime Minister Emile Combes.

== See also ==
- Anticlericalism and Freemasonry
