= Edmond Rousse =

French lawyer (1817–1906)

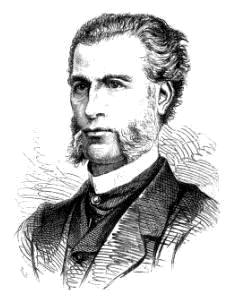
Edmond Rousse in 1871

Aimé Joseph Edmond Rousse (18 March 1817 – 1 August 1906) was a French lawyer, and member of the Académie française from 1880 until his death. He was born and died in Paris.

== Biography ==
He was called to the Barreau de Paris (Paris bar association), before becoming secretary to the Conférence des avocats, then member of the Conseil de l'Ordre des avocats (1862) puis and finally bâtonnier to the Barreau de Paris (1870).

He was secretary of Chaix-d'Est-Ange, of which he published the pleas, president, in 1870, of the Paris bar, he published his Pleas and Speeches in two volumes.

Elected to the Académie française on May 13, 1880 to replace Jules Favre, and received by the Duke d'Aumale on April 7, 1881. He received the Viscount Eugène-Melchior de Vogüé.

== Works ==
- Consultations sur les décrets du 29 mars 1880 (1880)
- Avocats et Magistrats (1903)

== See also ==
- Académie française
- Conférence des avocats du barreau de Paris
