= Gabriel Syveton =

French politician (1864–1904)

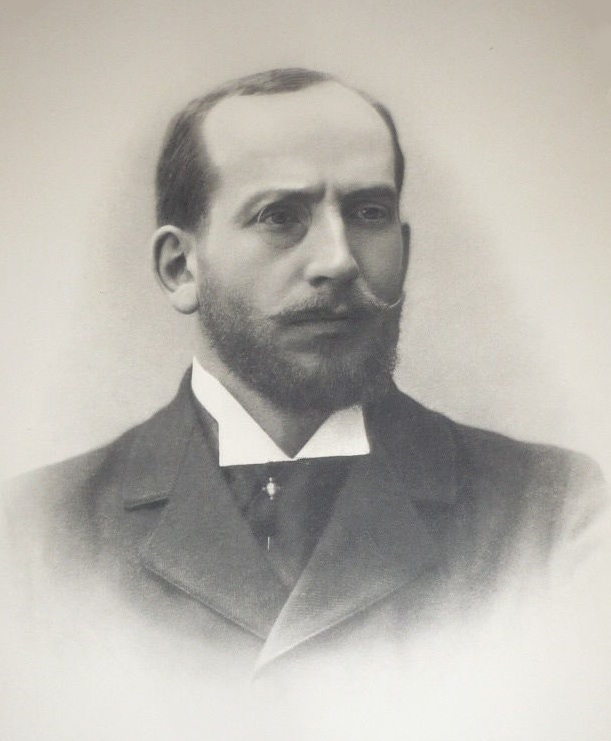
- Gabriel Syveton, 1904

Deputy for Seine
- In office 21 June 1903 – 8 December 1904

Personal details
- Born: Gabriel François Camille Eugène Syveton; 21 February 1864 Boën-sur-Lignon, Loire, France
- Died: 8 December 1904 (aged 40) Neuilly-sur-Seine, Hauts-de-Seine, France
- Occupation: Historian, politician
- Known for: Affaire Des Fiches

Gabriel Syveton (21 February 1864 – 8 December 1904) was a French historian and politician. He was one of the founding members of the patriotic and anti-Dreyfus Ligue de la patrie française. He was elected as deputy for the Seine in 1902. He exposed the existence of a card file compiled from Freemason reports on public officials. It listed practicing Catholics, who should be passed over for promotion. He was found dead the day before being required to appear in court after slapping the Minister of War in the Chamber of Deputies.

== Life ==
=== Early years ===
Gabriel Syveton was born on 21 February 1864 in Boën-sur-Lignon, Loire. He studied in Lyon and then in Paris, and passed his agrégation in history in 1888 as a doctor of letters and associate professor. He taught in turn at the lycées of Aix-en-Provence, Laon, Angoulême and Reims. From 1890 to 1892 the Ministry of Public Instruction and Fine Arts assigned him to a study mission in Austria-Hungary. He resigned in 1898 so he could follow a career in politics.

=== Ligue de la patrie française ===
The Ligue de la patrie française originated in 1898 with three young academics, Louis Dausset, Syveton and Henri Vaugeois, who wanted to show that support for Alfred Dreyfus, a French Jewish artillery officer who had been controversially convicted in 1894 on charges of treason, was not accepted by all university academics. The three circulated a manifesto that stated,

The undersigned, moved by seeing the most disastrous agitation prolonged; persuaded that it cannot last any longer without mortally compromising the vital interests of the French country, and most importantly those gloriously entrusted to the hands of the national army; persuaded also that in saying this we express the opinion of France; we have resolved: to work within the sphere of our professional duties to promote the advancement of the ideas, customs, and traditions of the French fatherland; To unite and gather together, without partisan spirit, to act pragmatically to this end by writing, speech, and example; and to strengthen the spirit of solidarity which has thankfully linked all generations of a great people.

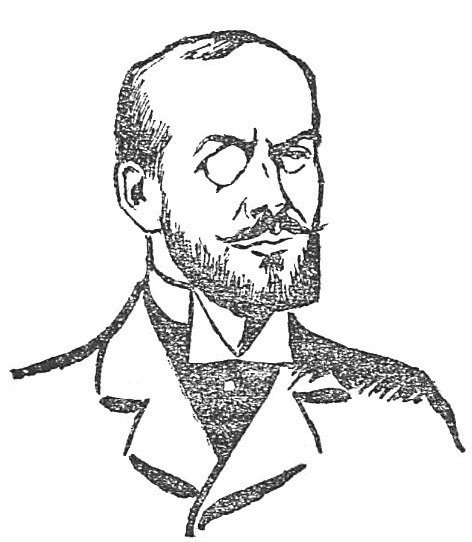
Syveton from La Presse, 8 April 1903

The manifesto attacked Émile Zola and what many saw as an internationalist, pacifist left-wing conspiracy. At first the manifesto was circulated only among lycée professors in Paris, but Maurice Barrès encouraged them to invite more professionals opposed to Dreyfus to sign, and to form the Ligue de la patrie française to implement the manifesto. After founding the League Syveton was asked to resume his university duties. Several days later he made a speech before the Academic Council of Paris that the League published as propaganda brochure under the title The University and the Nation. Syveton was suspended for a year, and after this had elapsed he was dismissed when he refused the various positions that were offered to him.

At meetings of the League around France, Syveton and François Coppée also claimed that the French Masons were a subversive influence in France, directed by the supreme head of Freemasonry, Edward VII of England. The masons worked with Protestants and Jews not only to undermine the supporters of Boulanger but to undermine France itself. Some anti-Dreyfusard and Social Catholic members of the League could not accept this position and left the movement.

=== Deputy ===
The League's candidates in the 1902 legislative elections did poorly outside of Paris. The League's treasurer Gabriel Syveton was elected deputy for the Seine. He ran in the legislative elections of 27 April 1902 for the 2nd arrondissement of Paris, and was elected in the first round. In the Chamber of Deputies he at once took an active part in creating the nationalist and republican group, of which he was appointed secretary. Others in the group were Godefroy Cavaignac and Albert Gauthier de Clagny.

On 6 December 1902 Syveton got into a heated exchange over the Humbert case with the Keeper of the Seals, and was temporarily excluded from the chamber until 29 January 1903. In February and March he spoke passionately against political interference in teacher appointments. His election to the 2nd arrondissement of Paris was invalidated on 7 April 1903 at the motion of Jean Jaurès, but he was reelected to this seat in the by-election of 21 June 1903.

During the 1904 municipal elections at a meeting of 5,000 nationalist members of the Ligue des Patriotes and the Ligue de la patrie française Syveton called on the audience to have nothing to do with the antisemitic Édouard Drumont or anyone else, such as Gaston Méry, connected to La Libre Parole. In his view antisemitism was damaging to the Patrie Française, and the party's candidates in the council elections should avoid the subject. The slogan "Down with the Jews" should not be used at the election rallies.

=== Affair des Fiches ===
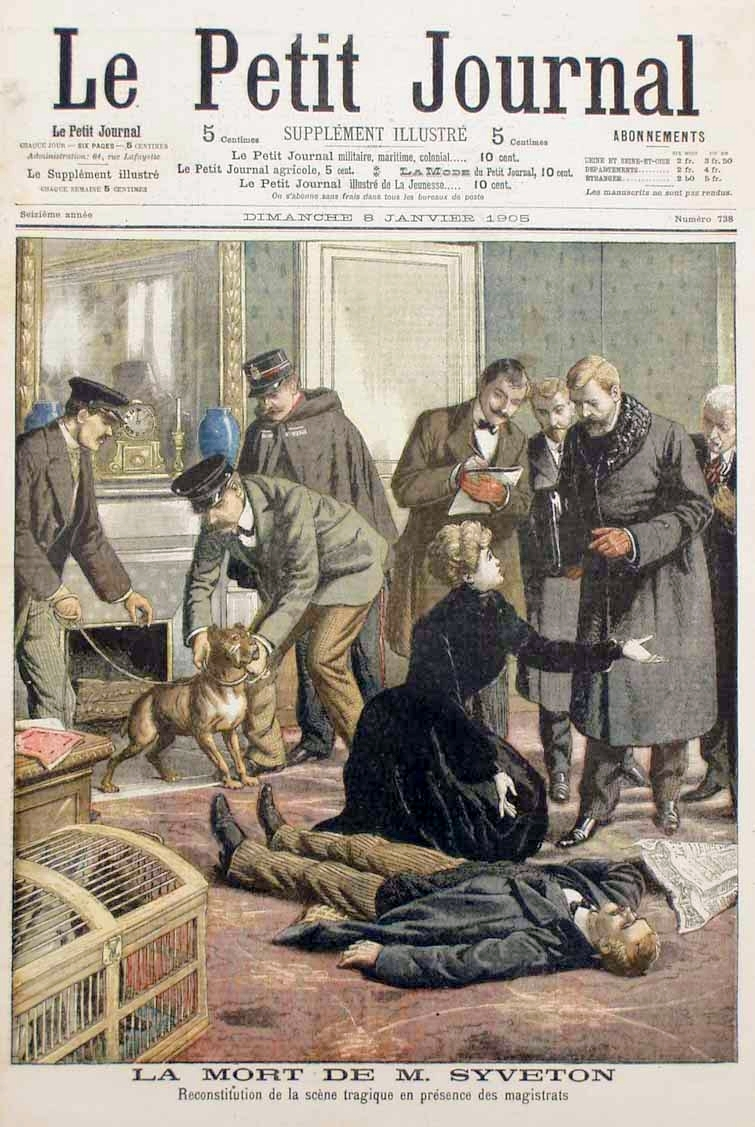
Mort de M. Syveton. Le Petit Journal

General Louis André, the militantly anticlerical War Minister from 1900 to 1904, used reports by Freemasons to build a huge card index on public officials that detailed those who were Catholic and attended Mass, with a view to preventing their promotions. In 1904, Jean Bidegain, assistant Secretary of Grand Orient de France, sold a selection of the files to Gabriel Syveton for 40,000 francs. On 4 November 1904 Guyot de Villeneuve repeated the charge against André, for which he now had documentary proof, and made the issue a vote of confidence which the Combes government survived by just two votes. After the vote, Syveton slapped André in the face twice. He was at once thrown out of the Chamber and put under arrest.

The Affaire Des Fiches scandal led directly to the resignation of prime minister Émile Combes.

=== Death ===
Syveton's case was referred to the Court of Assizes of the Seine. on 8 December 1904, the day before his trial, Syveton was found dead in his office by his wife. An inquiry found that he had died by asphyxiation from a malfunctioning gas heater in the room.

The press freely speculated over whether it was an accident, suicide or murder. It was said that his marriage was unhappy and he was well insured, so his wife would have had a motive. It might be connected with the loss of the League's financial records. (Note: The League's financial records were eventually found in Antwerp. It seems that Syveton had taken 200,000 francs, but there was no evidence he had embezzled it rather than simply giving it out to political allies without keeping records.) The nationalists suspected that he had been assassinated by Masons in revenge for exposing the card file.

== See also ==
- List of unsolved deaths

== Publications ==
Publications included:

- Gabriel Syveton (1896), Une cour et un aventurier au XVIIIe siècle. Le baron de Ripperda, d'après des documents inédits..., Paris: E. Leroux
- Gabriel Syveton (1889), L'esprit militaire (discours prononcé à la distribution des prix du lycée d'Aix, le 26 juillet 1889), Saint-Étienne : impr. de Théolier
- Gabriel Syveton (10 December 1899), "L'évolution de M. A. France de l'ironie conservatrice au mysticisme révolutionnaire...", Le Correspondant: 1005–1011
- Gabriel Syveton (19 November 1898), "Hermann Sudermann", Revue Hebdomadaire: 375–387
- Gabriel Syveton (1900), Louis XIV et Charles XII au camp d'Altrandstadt, 1707, la mission du Bon de Besenval, Preface by Albert de Broglie, Paris: E. Leroux
- Gabriel Syveton (23 October 1897), "Livres nouveaux. M. Anatole France, "le Mannequin d'osier"...", Revue Bleue (17): 535–539
- Gabriel Syveton (1899), L'Université et la Nation (plaidoyer prononcé devant le Conseil académique de Paris le 18 juillet 1899), Paris: la Patrie française

== Sources ==
- Conner, Tom (2014-04-24), The Dreyfus Affair and the Rise of the French Public Intellectual, McFarland, ISBN 978-0-7864-7862-0
- d'Appollonia, Ariane Chebel (1998-12-01), L'extrême-droite en France: De Maurras à Le Pen, Editions Complexe, ISBN 978-2-87027-764-5
- Franklin, James (2006), "Freemasonry in Europe", Catholic Values and Australian Realities, Connor Court Publishing Pty Ltd, ISBN 9780975801543
- Fuller, Robert Lynn (2012-04-19), The Origins of the French Nationalist Movement, 1886–1914, McFarland, ISBN 978-0-7864-9025-7
- "Gabriel Syveton (1864-1904) - Auteur du texte", BnF: Bibliotheque nationale de France
- Jolly, Jean (1977), Dictionnaire des parlementaires français de 1889 à 1940, Documentation française, ISBN 2-1100-1998-0
- "Ligue de la patrie française", Dictionnaire de l'Histoire de France (in French), Éditions Larousse, 2005
- Pierrard, Pierre (1998), Les Chrétiens et l'affaire Dreyfus, Editions de l'Atelier, ISBN 978-2-7082-3390-4
- Read, Piers Paul (2012), The Dreyfus Affair: The Scandal that Tore France in Two, Bloomsbury Press
