= Henri Vaugeois =

French teacher and journalist

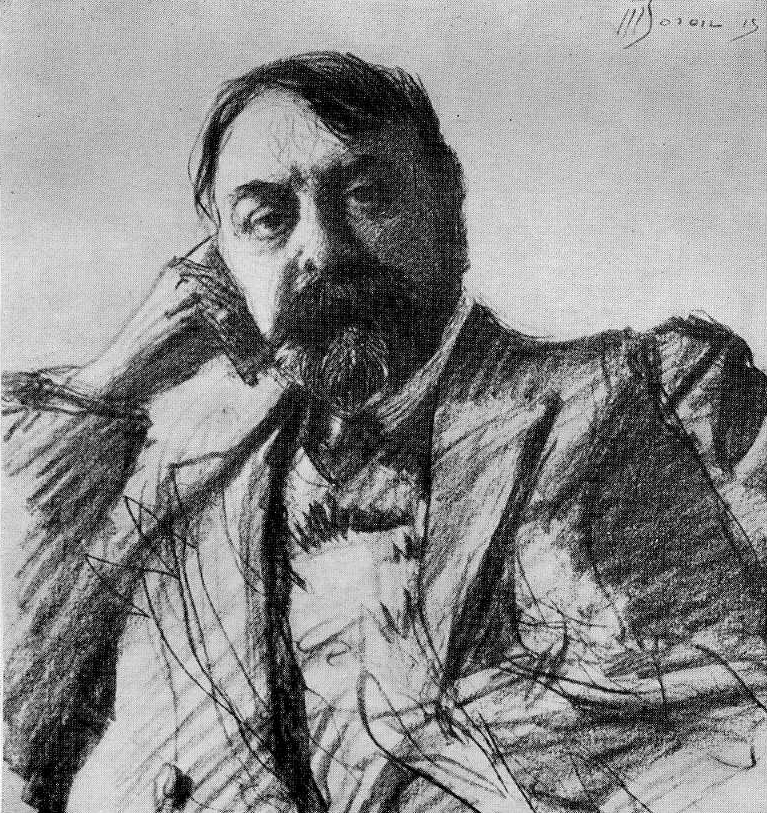
- Born: 25 April 1864; L'Aigle, Orne, France
- Died: 11 April 1916 (aged 51); Paris France
- Occupation: Teacher

Henri Vaugeois (25 April 1864 – 11 April 1916) was a French teacher and journalist who was one of the founders of right-wing nationalist Action Française movement.

== Biography ==
Vaugeois was born in L'Aigle, Orne, on 25 April 1864. He settled in Coulommiers, where he taught philosophy. Initially a republican liberal, Vaugeois even flirted with Marxism in his youth. However he later came to side with the anti-Dreyfus camp. In April 1898, at the height of the Dreyfus affair, the circle of leftist intellectuals to which Vaugeois belonged became supporters of Alfred Dreyfus. Vaugeois and Maurice Pujo left this group.

Late in 1898 Vaugeois, Pujo and a few other nationalists who met at the Café de Flore founded the Comité d'action française (Committee of French Action). Three of this group, Louis Dausset, Gabriel Syveton and Vaugeois, opposed to the League for the Rights of Man and Dreyfus, launched a petition that attacked Émile Zola and what many saw as an internationalist, pacifist left-wing conspiracy. In November 1898 their petition gained signatures in the Parisian schools, and was soon circulated throughout political, intellectual and artistic circles in Paris. The decision to create the nationalist anti-Dreyfusard Ligue de la patrie française (League of the French Homeland) was made on 31 December 1898. The Comité d'action française was merged into the League, which was led by Jules Lemaître.

The circle around Vaugeois quickly became disillusioned with the League, which lacked any clear doctrine. Vaugeois also disagreed with Lemaître's plan to participate in the next legislative elections. The Comité d'action française was recreated in April 1899, and the foundational conference of the Action Française movement was held on 20 June 1899 in Paris. In his keynote speech at this meeting Vaugeois declared that the movement stood for "anti-Semitic, anti-Masonic, anti-parliamentary and anti-democratic" nationalism. Charles Maurras joined the Action Française shortly after. Maurras thought the Bourbon monarchy should be restored, using violence if needed. Maurras convinced Vaugeois to abandon his republican ideals in favour of monarchism. Pujo wrote later, "Under the mortal blows of Charles Maurras, the republicanism of each of us succumbed one by one in this year, 1900, which was the year of the hegira for the Action Francaise."

In 1899 Vaugeois lost his teaching post after joining Paul Déroulède's half-hearted coup attempt. Vaugeois was a weak politician and a poor speaker and as such did not gain much influence in the new movement, over and above directing the group's eponymous daily paper (which he and Pujo had initially founded). Within the movement he became one of the strongest voices in support of antisemitism.

He died in Paris on 11 April 1916, leaving a widow who was several years his junior.

== Works ==
- (1899). L'Action Française.
- (1901). Au Conseil Supérieur de l'Instruction Publique.
- (1901). Un Français chez le Duc d’Orléans.
- (1902). Le Banquet de ″l'Étape″, 7 juillet 1902.
- (1916). Notre Pays. Figures de France. Voyages d’Action Française. Le Temps de la Guerre.
- (1917). La Morale de Kant dans l’Université de France.
- (1928). L'Interrègne, 1793-19… La Fin de l'Erreur Française. Du Nationalisme Républicain au Nationalisme Intégral.

== Sources ==
- Cépoy, Jacques (Spring 1999), "Maurice Pujo", L'Action Française 2000 - Numéro hors-série (in French), archived from the original on 2016-03-03
- Conner, Tom (2014-04-24), The Dreyfus Affair and the Rise of the French Public Intellectual, McFarland, ISBN 978-0-7864-7862-0
- d'Appollonia, Ariane Chebel (1998-12-01), L'extrême-droite en France: De Maurras à Le Pen, Editions Complexe, ISBN 978-2-87027-764-5
- Gildea, Robert (2008), Children of the Revolution: The French, 1799-1914, Harvard University Press
- Osgood, Samuel M. (2013-11-21), French Royalism Since 1870, Springer, ISBN 978-94-017-5071-4
- Pierrard, Pierre (1998), Les Chrétiens et l'affaire Dreyfus, Editions de l'Atelier, ISBN 978-2-7082-3390-4
- Rees, Philip (1990), Biographical Dictionary of the Extreme Right Since 1890, New York: Simon & Schuster
- Stuart, Robert (2006), Marxism and National Identity: Socialism, Nationalism, and National Socialism During the French fin de Siècle, SUNY Press
- Weber, Eugen (1962), Action Française: Royalism and Reaction in Twentieth Century France, Stanford University Press
