= Conférence des avocats du barreau de Paris =

- Type: Bar association
- Region served: France

The Conférence des avocats du barreau de Paris is an association of French lawyers founded in 1810 which brings together twelve young lawyers elected by their peers (following a three-round oratory contest), working as a special task force on sensitive criminal cases.

== History ==
Many Secrétaires de la conférence have distinguished themselves in French culture and politics such as Members of the Académie française Members of the Government, Members of Parliament, Presidents of the French Republic (Jules Grévy, Raymond Poincaré, Alexandre Millerand).

Many notable lawyers were Secrétaires de la Conférence and marked French judicial history. Among them Fernand Labori who defended Alfred Dreyfus and Jacques Vergès famous for having defended Klaus Barbie and Sadam Hussein.

== The conference competition ==
The twelve Secrétaires de la conférence (incumbent secretaries) designate their successors following a three-round oratory contest known as concours d'éloquence in which the candidates (around 300) are assigned to give a speech on a non legal related and very confusing subject.

== Criminal defense ==
The conference is charged by the Paris' Bâtonnier (President of the Bar association) with the defence of sensitive criminal matters (rapes, murder, terrorism, fast track procedures) from the custody stage until the trial before the Cour d'assises (French criminal court).

== The representation of the Paris Bar ==
The conference represents the Paris bar association in France and abroad, particularly with the French-speaking bars, with which it maintains long-lasting and privileged links.

The conference is also present in sensitive trials abroad to report and alert when human rights are threatened.

The Conférence also engages in lobbying every time a new draft bill regarding criminal law, is discussed in the Government or before the Parliament.

== See also ==
- Cour d'assises
- French criminal law
