= Jacques Marie Eugène Godefroy Cavaignac =

French politician (1853–1905)

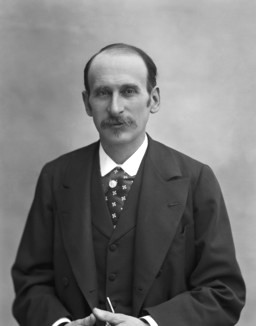
Jacques Marie Eugène Godefroy Cavaignac

Jacques Marie Eugène Godefroy Cavaignac (May 21, 1853 – September 25, 1905), known as Godefroy Cavaignac, was a French politician.

== Early life ==
Born in Paris, he was the son of Louis Eugène Cavaignac. He made public profession of his republican principles as a schoolboy at the Lycée Charlemagne by refusing in 1867 to receive a prize at the Sorbonne from the hand of the Prince Imperial.

== Third Republic ==
He received the military medal for service in the Franco-Prussian War and in 1872 entered the École Polytechnique. He served as a civil engineer in Angoulême until 1881, when he became master of requests in the Council of State.

The next year, he was elected as a republican deputy for the arrondissement of Saint-Calais (Sarthe). In 1885–1886, he was undersecretary for war in the Henri Brisson ministry, and served in the cabinet of Émile Loubet (1892) as Minister of Marine and of the Colonies. He had exchanged his moderate republicanism for radical views before he became War Minister in the cabinet of Léon Bourgeois (November 1, 1895 to April 29, 1896).

He was again Minister of War in the Brisson cabinet from June 28 to September 5, 1898. In July 1898, he told the French National Assembly of documents incriminating Captain Alfred Dreyfus. Cavaignac's investigator, Captain Louis Cuignet, later discovered that the critical document was a forgery by Colonel Henry, who admitted his crime when he was questioned on August 30 by Cavaignac. Still, Cavaignac refused to concur with his colleagues in a revision of the Dreyfus prosecution, which would have been the logical outcome of his own exposure of the forgery. Resigning his portfolio, he continued to declare his conviction of Dreyfus's guilt and joined the nationalist group in the chamber of which he became one of its leaders. (He is portrayed in precisely the opposite way in the 1937 film The Life of Emile Zola in which he is depicted as the person who finally discovers the truth and demands the resignation of all those responsible for incriminating Dreyfus.) He also was an energetic supporter of the Ligue de la Patrie Française.

In 1899, Cavaignac was an unsuccessful candidate for French President.

== Death ==
He had announced his intention of retiring from political life when he died at his country home near Flée (Sarthe) on September 25, 1905, aged 52.

== Works ==
He wrote an important book on the Formation de la Prusse contemporaine (2 vols., 1891–1898), dealing with the events of 1806–1813 around Napoleonic Wars.

== See also ==
- History of France in the nineteenth century
- Republican Union (France)
- Opportunist Republicans
- Radical-Socialist Party
- History of the French Left
- Dreyfus Affair
