= Louis Dausset =

French politician

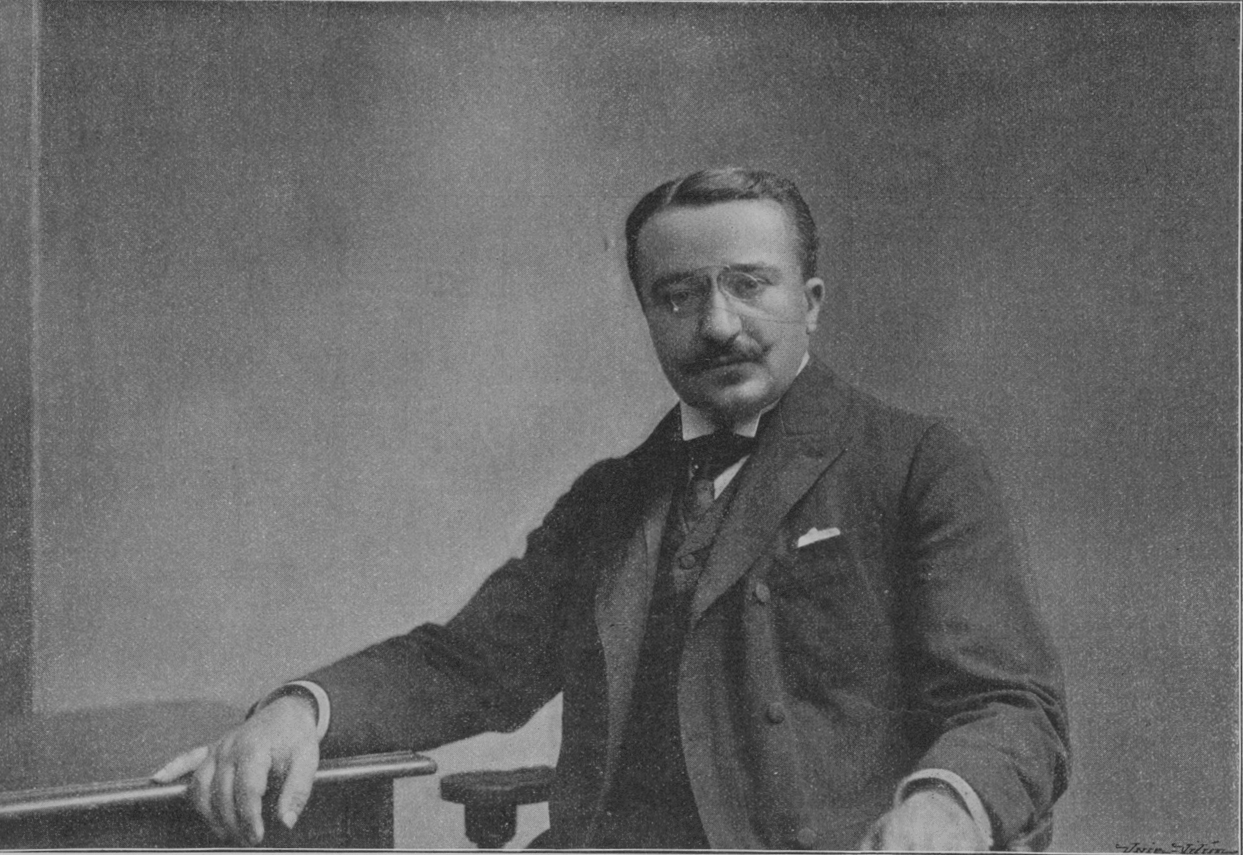
- Born: 3 September 1866; Tarbes, Hautes-Pyrénées, France
- Died: 22 January 1940 (aged 73); Neuilly-sur-Marne, Seine-et-Oise, France
- Occupation: Politician

Louis Dausset (September 3, 1866 – January 22, 1940) was a French politician. He served as a member of the French Senate from 1920 to 1927, representing Seine.
