= Émile Loubet =

President of France from 1899 to 1906

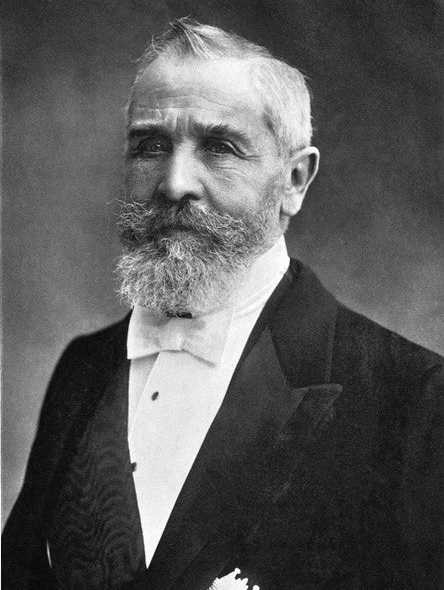
- Photograph by Paul Nadar, 1900

President of France
- In office 18 February 1899 – 18 February 1906
- Prime Minister: Charles Dupuy; Pierre Waldeck-Rousseau; Émile Combes; Maurice Rouvier
- Preceded by: Félix Faure
- Succeeded by: Armand Fallières

Prime Minister of France
- In office 27 February 1892 – 6 December 1892
- President: Sadi Carnot
- Preceded by: Charles de Freycinet
- Succeeded by: Alexandre Ribot

President of the Senate
- In office 16 January 1896 – 18 February 1899
- Preceded by: Paul Challemel-Lacour
- Succeeded by: Armand Fallières

Minister of the Interior
- In office 27 February 1892 – 11 January 1893
- Prime Minister: Himself; Alexandre Ribot
- Preceded by: Ernest Constans
- Succeeded by: Alexandre Ribot

Minister of Public Works
- In office 12 December 1887 – 3 April 1888
- Prime Minister: Pierre Tirard
- Preceded by: Severiano de Heredia
- Succeeded by: Pierre Deluns-Montaud

Personal details
- Born: 30 December 1838 Marsanne, France
- Died: 20 December 1929 (aged 90) Montélimar, France
- Party: Democratic Republican Alliance
- Spouse: Marie-Louise Picard (m. 1869; died 1925)
- Education: University of Paris

Émile François Loubet (French: [emil lubɛ]; 30 December 1838 – 20 December 1929) was the 45th Prime Minister of France from February to December 1892 and later President of France from 1899 to 1906.

Trained in law, he became mayor of Montélimar, where he was noted as a forceful orator. He was elected to the Chamber of Deputies in 1876 and the Senate in 1885. He was appointed as a Republican minister under Carnot and Ribot. He was briefly Prime Minister of France in 1892. As President, he saw the successful Paris Exhibition of 1900, and the forging of the Entente Cordiale with the United Kingdom of Great Britain and Ireland, resolving their sharp differences over the Boer War and the Dreyfus Affair.

== Early life ==
Loubet was born on 30 December 1838, the son of a peasant proprietor and mayor of Marsanne (Drôme). Admitted to the Parisian bar in 1862, he took his doctorate in law the next year. He was still a student when he witnessed the sweeping triumph of the Republican party in Paris at the general election in 1863, during the Second French Empire. He settled down to the exercise of his profession in Montélimar, where in 1869 he married Marie-Louise Picard. He also inherited a small estate at Grignan.

== Physical description ==
American politician William Jennings Bryan described Loubet as "below the medium height, even for Frenchmen. His shoulders are broad and his frame indicative of great physical strength. His hair is snow white, as are also his beard and mustache. He wears his beard square cut at the chin. . . . His voice is soft, and he speaks with great vivacity, emphasizing his words by expressive gestures."

== Political career ==
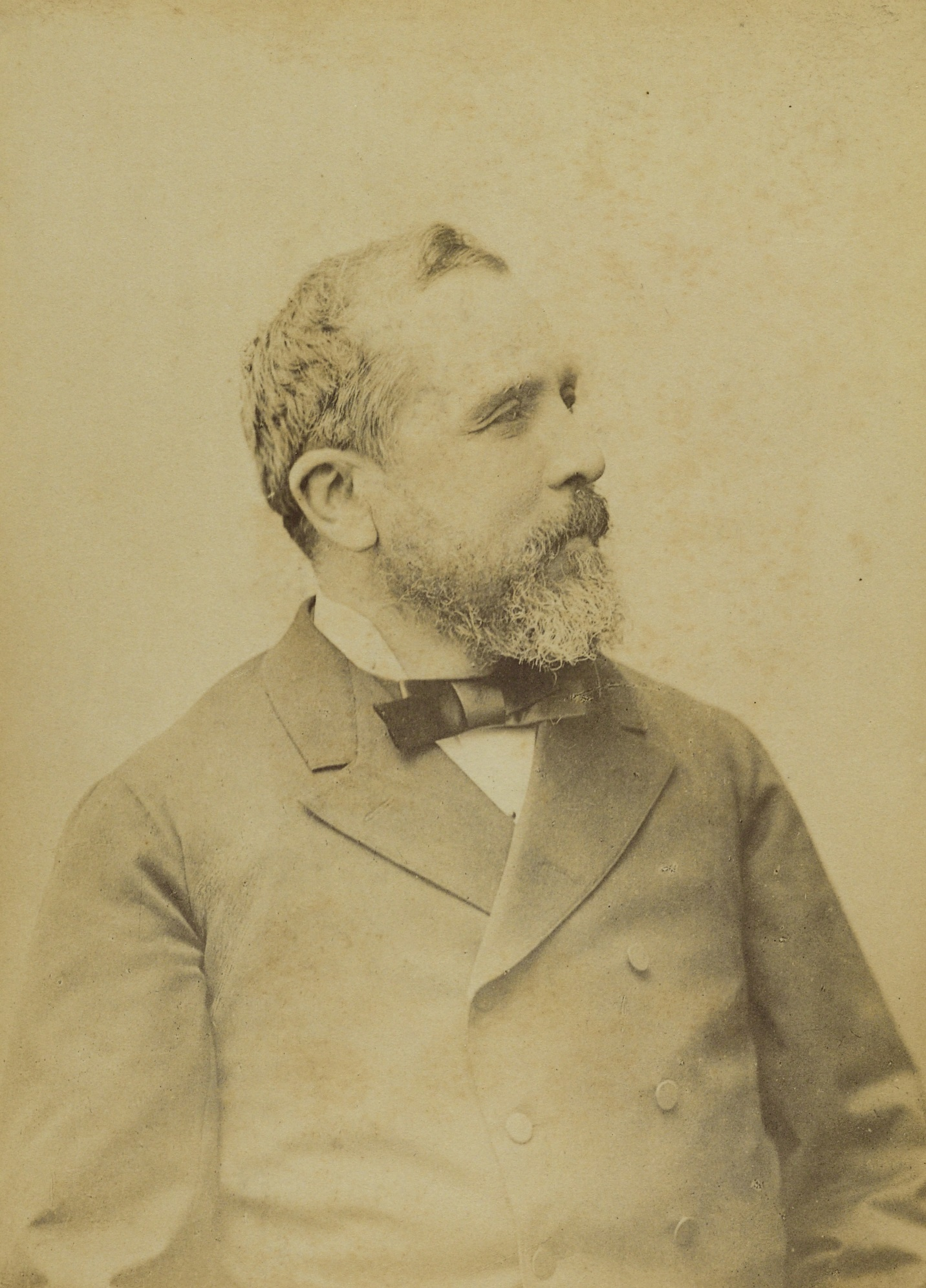
Émile Loubet, c. 1880s

At the crisis of 1870, which brought about the Empire's end, he became mayor of Montélimar, and thenceforward was a steady supporter of Léon Gambetta. Elected to the Chamber of Deputies in 1876 by Montélimar, he was one of the notable 363 parliamentarians who in the 16 May 1877 crisis passed a vote of no confidence in the ministry of Albert, the duke of Broglie.

In the general election of October he was re-elected, local enthusiasm for him being increased by the fact that the government had driven him from the mayoralty. In the Chamber he occupied himself especially with education, fighting the clerical system established by the Loi Falloux, and working for the establishment of free, obligatory and secular primary instruction. In 1880 he became president of the departmental council in Drôme. His support of the second Jules Ferry ministry and his zeal for the colonial expansion of France gave him considerable weight in the moderate Republican party.

He had entered the Senate in 1885, and he became minister of public works in the Tirard ministry (December 1887 to March 1888). In 1892 President Sadi Carnot, who was his personal friend, asked him to form a cabinet. Loubet held the portfolio of the interior with the premiership, and had to deal with the anarchist crimes of that year and with the great strike of Carmaux, in which he acted as arbitrator, giving a decision regarded in many quarters as too favourable to the strikers. He was defeated in November on the question of the Panama scandals, but he retained the ministry of the interior in the next cabinet under Alexandre Ribot, though he resigned on its reconstruction in January.

During his premiership, a law was introduced in November 1892 that regulated the employment of children and women in workshops and factories.

== President of the French Republic (1899–1906) ==
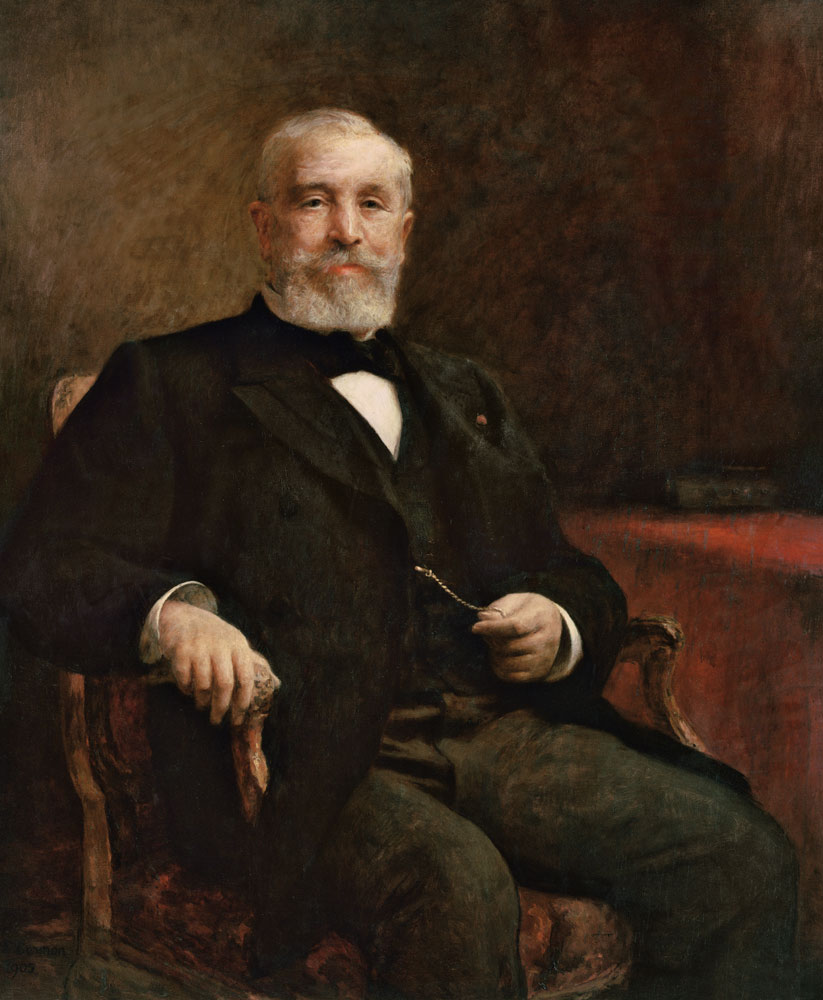
Painting of Loubet

His standing as a moderate statesman and a skilled orator led to his election as president of the senate in 1896. In February 1899, he was chosen president of the republic in succession to Félix Faure by 483 votes as against 279 recorded by Jules Méline, his only serious competitor.

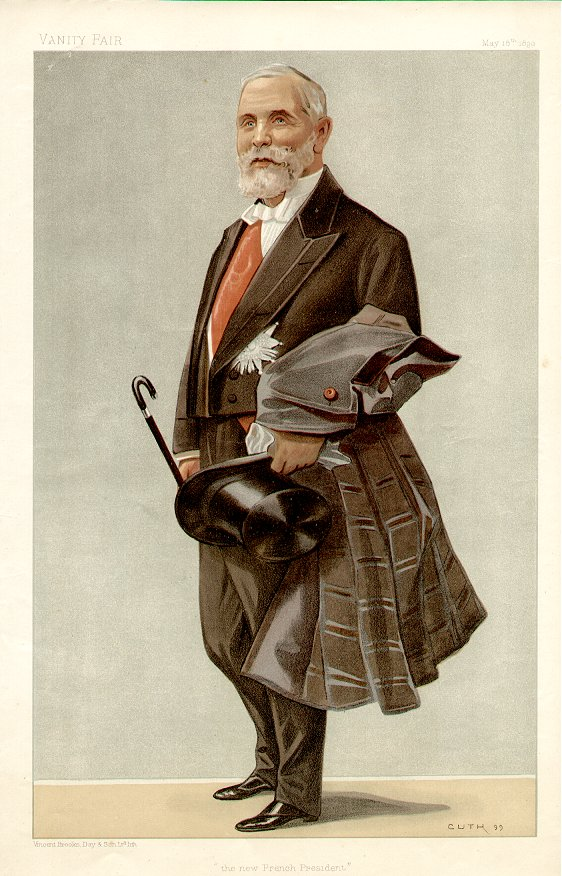
Loubet caricatured by Guth for Vanity Fair, 1899

He was marked out for fierce opposition and bitter insult, as the representative of that section of the Republican party which sought the revision of the Dreyfus affair. On the day of President Faure's funeral Paul Déroulède met the troops under General Roget on their return to barracks, and demanded that the general should march on the Elysée. Roget sensibly took his troops back to barracks. At the Auteuil steeplechase in June, the president was struck on the head with a cane by an anti-Dreyfusard. In that month President Loubet summoned Waldeck-Rousseau to form a cabinet, and at the same time entreated Republicans of all shades of opinion to rally to the defence of the state. By the efforts of Loubet and Waldeck-Rousseau the Dreyfus affair was settled, when Loubet, acting on the advice of General Galliffet, minister of war, remitted the ten years' imprisonment to which Dreyfus was condemned at Rennes.

Loubet's presidency saw an acute stage of the clerical question, which was attacked by Pierre Waldeck-Rousseau and in still more drastic fashion by the Combes ministry. The French ambassador was recalled from the Vatican in April 1905, and in July the separation of church and state was voted in the Chamber of Deputies. Feeling had run high between France and Britain over the mutual criticisms passed on the conduct of the South African War and the Dreyfus affair respectively. These differences were composed, by the Anglo-French entente, and in 1904 a convention between the two countries secured the recognition of French claims in Morocco in exchange for non-interference with the British occupation of Egypt. President Loubet belonged to the peasant-proprietor class, and had none of the aristocratic proclivities of President Faure. He inaugurated the Paris Exhibition of 1900, received the Emperor Nicholas II of Russia at the French maneuvers of 1901 and paid a visit to Russia in 1902.

On 4 July 1902 President Loubet was elected an honorary member of the Rhode Island Society of the Cincinnati.

Loubet also exchanged visits with Kings Edward VII of Great Britain, Carlos I of Portugal, Victor Emmanuel III of Italy, and Alfonso XIII of Spain. During Alfonso XIII's visit in 1905, an attempt was made on his life, a bomb being thrown under his carriage as he and with his guest left the Opéra Garnier. When his presidency came to an end in January 1906, he became the first President of the Third Republic to have served a full term and without resigning a second one. He retired into private life and died on 20 December 1929 at the age of 90.

== In popular culture ==
President Loubet appears in the children's fantasy novel The Master Key (1901) by L. Frank Baum.

== Honours ==
He received the following orders and decorations:

- Belgium: Grand Cordon of the Order of Leopold, 1900
- Principality of Bulgaria: Grand Cross of St. Alexander, in Diamonds, July 1902
- Denmark: Knight of the Elephant, 1 November 1900
- Ethiopian Empire: Grand Cross of the Star of Ethiopia
- German Empire: Knight of the Black Eagle
- Kingdom of Italy: Knight of the Annunciation, 10 April 1901
- Empire of Japan: Grand Cordon of the Order of the Chrysanthemum, 5 August 1899
- Luxembourg: Knight of the Gold Lion of Nassau, 1902
- Netherlands: Grand Cross of the Netherlands Lion, 1902
- Ottoman Empire: Order of Distinction
- Kingdom of Portugal: Grand Cross of the Tower and Sword, October 1902 – during the visit of King Carlos I to France
- Russian Empire:
  - Knight of St. Andrew
  - Knight of St. Alexander Nevsky
  - Knight of St. Anna, 1st Class
  - Knight of St. Stanislaus, 1st Class
- San Marino: Grand Cross of the Order of San Marino
- Kingdom of Serbia: Grand Cross of the White Eagle
- Spain: Knight of the Golden Fleece, 22 June 1902 – invested by the Duke of Sesto, special representative of the Spanish King, in a ceremony in Paris
- Siam: Knight of the Order of the Royal House of Chakri, 29 August 1902
- Sweden-Norway:
  - Knight of the Seraphim, 17 April 1899
  - Knight of the Norwegian Lion, 1 December 1904
- Monaco: Grand Cross of St. Charles, 15 March 1901

== Loubet's Ministry, 27 February – 6 December 1892 ==
- Émile Loubet – President of the Council and Minister of the Interior
- Alexandre Ribot – Minister of Foreign Affairs
- Charles de Freycinet – Minister of War
- Maurice Rouvier – Minister of Finance
- Louis Ricard – Minister of Justice and Worship
- Jules Roche – Minister of Commerce, Industry, and the Colonies
- Godefroy Cavaignac – Minister of Marine
- Léon Bourgeois – Minister of Public Instruction and Fine Arts
- Jules Develle – Minister of Agriculture
- Yves Guyot – Minister of Public Works

Changes

- 8 March 1892 – Godefroy Cavaignac succeeds Roche as Minister for the Colonies. Roche remains Minister of Commerce and Industry.

Political offices
Preceded by Severiano de Heredia	Minister of Public Works; 1887–1888	Succeeded by Pierre Deluns-Montaud
Preceded by Charles de Freycinet	Prime Minister of France; 1892	Succeeded by Alexandre Ribot
Preceded by Ernest Constans	Minister of the Interior; 1892–1893	Succeeded by Alexandre Ribot
Preceded by Paul-Armand Challemel-Lacour	President of the Senate; 1895–1899	Succeeded by Armand Fallières
Preceded by Félix Faure	President of France; 1899–1906	Succeeded by Armand Fallières
Regnal titles
Preceded by Félix Faure	Co-Prince of Andorra; 1899–1906; Served alongside: Salvador Casañas i Pagés (1899–1901); Ramon Riu i Cabanes (1901); Toribio Martín (Acting); Joan Josep Laguarda i Fenollera (1902–1906)	Succeeded by Armand Fallières
