= Léon Bourgeois =

French statesman (1851–1925)

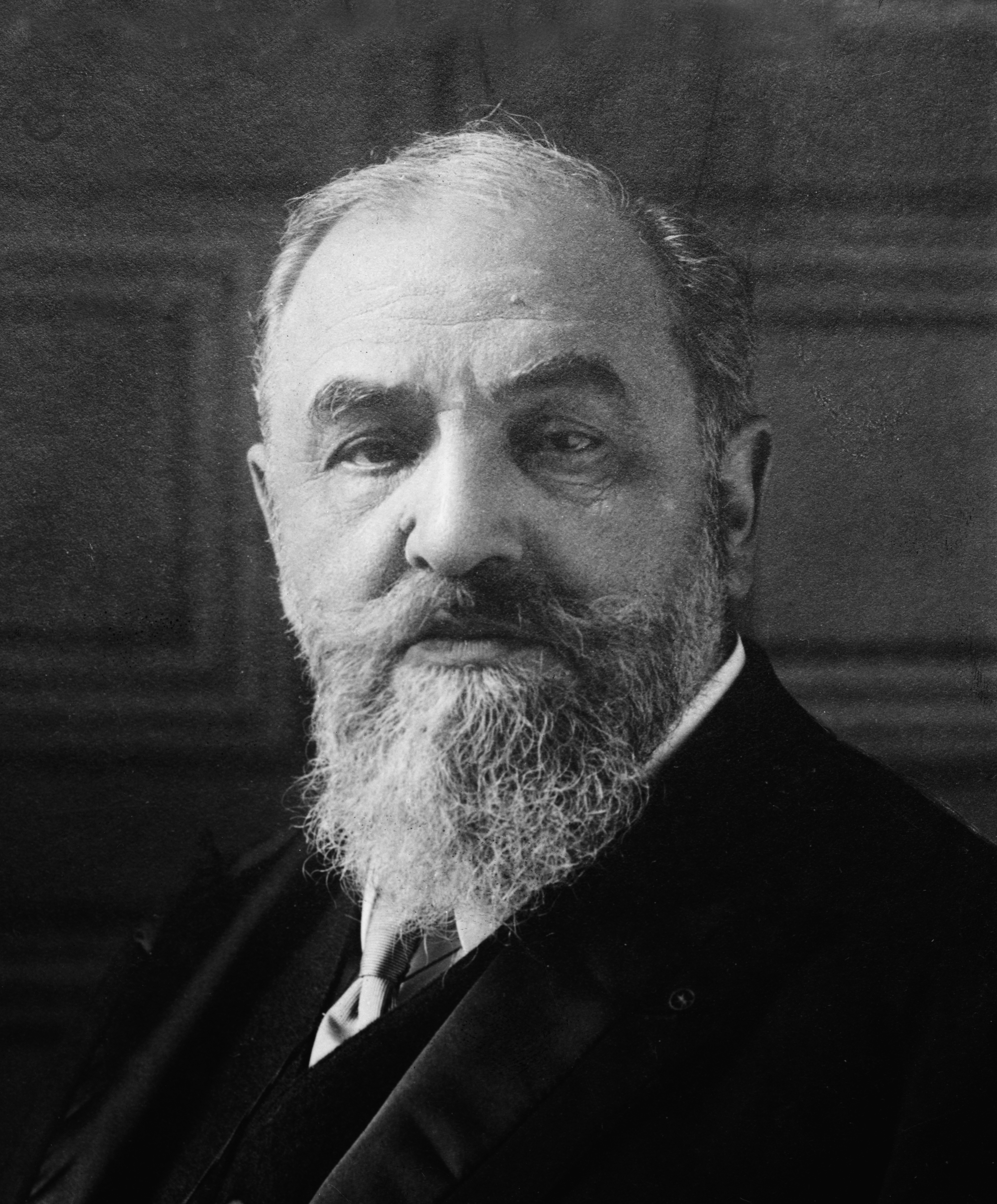

Prime Minister of France
- In office 1 November 1895 – 29 April 1896
- President: Félix Faure
- Preceded by: Alexandre Ribot
- Succeeded by: Jules Méline

President of the Senate
- In office 14 January 1920 – 22 February 1923
- Preceded by: Antonin Dubost
- Succeeded by: Gaston Doumergue

President of the Chamber of Deputies
- In office 6 June 1902 – 12 January 1904
- Preceded by: Paul Deschanel
- Succeeded by: Henri Brisson

Minister of Foreign Affairs
- In office 28 March 1896 – 29 April 1896
- President: Félix Faure
- Prime Minister: Himself
- Preceded by: Marcelin Berthelot
- Succeeded by: Gabriel Hanotaux

Minister of the Interior
- In office 1 November 1895 – 28 March 1896
- President: Félix Faure
- Prime Minister: Himself
- Preceded by: Georges Leygyes
- Succeeded by: Ferdinand Sarrien

Minister of State
- In office 29 Octobre 1915 – 12 December 1916
- President: Raymond Poincaré
- Prime Minister: Aristide Briand
- In office 12 September 1917 – 13 November 1917
- President: Raymond Poincaré
- Prime Minister: Paul Painlevé

Personal details
- Born: 21 May 1851 Paris
- Died: 29 September 1925 (aged 74) Oger
- Resting place: Cimetière de l'Ouest, Châlons-en-Champagne
- Party: Radical
- Spouse: Virginie Marguerite Sellier
- Education: Université de Paris
- Awards: Nobel Peace Prize, 1920

Léon Victor Auguste Bourgeois (French: [leɔ̃ buʁʒwa]; 21 May 1851 – 29 September 1925) was a French statesman. His ideas influenced the Radical Party regarding a wide range of issues.

He promoted progressive taxation such as progressive income taxes and social insurance schemes, along with economic equality, expanded educational opportunities, and cooperative solidarism. In foreign policy, he called for a strong League of Nations, and the maintenance of peace through compulsory arbitration, controlled disarmament, economic sanctions, and perhaps an international military force.

== Biography ==
Bourgeois was born in Paris in to a modest Republican family of a watchmaker of Burgundian descent, and was trained in law, graduating from his university in 1874. After holding a subordinate office (1876) in the department of public works, he became successively prefect of the Tarn (1882) and the Haute-Garonne (1885), and then returned to Paris to enter the Ministry of the Interior.

He became Prefect of Police in November 1887 at the critical moment of Jules Grévy's resignation from the presidency. In the following year, he entered the Chamber, being elected deputy for the Marne, in opposition to George Boulanger, and joined the Radical Left. He was undersecretary for Home Affairs in Charles Floquet's ministry of 1888 and resigned with it in 1889, being then returned to the chamber for Reims. In Pierre Tirard's ministry, which succeeded, he was Minister of the Interior, and subsequently, on 18 March 1890, Minister of Public Instruction in the cabinet of Charles Louis de Saulces de Freycinet, a post for which he had qualified himself by the attention he had given to educational matters. In this capacity, he was responsible for some important reforms in secondary education in 1890.

He retained his office in Émile Loubet's cabinet in 1892, and was Minister of Justice under Alexandre Ribot at the end of that year, when the Panama scandals were making the office one of peculiar difficulty. He energetically pressed the Panama prosecution, so much so that he was accused of having put wrongful pressure on the wife of one of the defendants in order to procure evidence. To meet the charge, he resigned in March 1893 but again took office and retired only with the rest of the Freycinet ministry.

In November 1895, he formed his own cabinet, distinctively radical, which fell as the result of a constitutional crisis arising from the persistent refusal of the Senate to vote supply. He was an eminent Freemason and eight of his cabinet members were Freemasons.

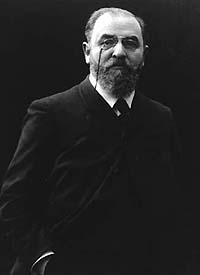
Official portrait of Léon Bourgeois

The Bourgeois ministry seemed to think that popular opinion would enable them to override what they regarded as an unconstitutional action on the part of the upper house. However, the public was indifferent, and the Senate triumphed. The blow damaged Bourgeois's career as an homme de gouvernement. As Minister of Public Instruction in the Brisson cabinet of 1898, he organized courses for adults in primary education. After the short ministry, he represented his country with dignity and effect at the Hague Peace Convention, and in 1903 was nominated a member of the permanent court of arbitration.

He held somewhat aloof from the political struggles of the Waldeck-Rousseau and Combes ministries, travelling considerably in foreign countries. In 1902 and 1903, he was elected president of the Chamber. In 1905, he replaced the duc d'Audiffret-Pasquier as senator for the department of Marne, and in May 1906, he became Minister of Foreign Affairs in the Sarrien cabinet. He was responsible for the direction of French diplomacy in the conference at Algeciras. He was delegate to both Hague Conferences held in 1899 and 1907. Bourgeois also became delegate to Paris Peace Conference and strongly supported the Japanese Racial Equality Proposal as "an indisputable principle of justice".

Following World War I, he became President of the Assembly of the League of Nations and won the Nobel Peace Prize for his work in 1920.

A social republican, Bourgeois sought a middle ground between socialism and capitalism which he termed "solidarism". He believed that the rich had a social debt to the poor which they should pay by the income tax, thus providing the state with the necessary revenue to finance social measures for those living in poverty. However, the Senate opposed his proposal, and opposition grew until his resignation as prime minister.

During his premiership, a law of December the 27th 1895 related to an existing pension fund was passed that gave workmen the right to claim repayments in case of judicial liquidation or failure.

== Bourgeois's Ministry, 1 November 1895 – 29 April 1896 ==
- Léon Bourgeois – President of the Council and Minister of the Interior
- Marcellin Berthelot – Minister of Foreign Affairs
- Godefroy Cavaignac – Minister of War
- Paul Doumer – Minister of Finance
- Louis Ricard – Minister of Justice
- Édouard Locroy – Minister of Marine
- Émile Combes – Minister of Public Instruction, Fine Arts, and Worship
- Albert Viger – Minister of Agriculture
- Pierre-Paul Guieysse – Minister of Colonies
- Edmond Guyot-Dessaigne – Minister of Public Works
- Gustave Mesureur – Minister of Commerce, Industry, Posts, and Telegraphs

Changes

- 28 March 1896 – Bourgeois succeeds Berthelot as Minister of Foreign Affairs. Ferdinand Sarrien succeeds Bourgeois as Minister of the Interior.

== Support to the French National Museum of Natural History ==
Bourgeois is one of the founders of the Friends of the Natural History Museum Paris society. He was the very first president in office from 1907 to 1922.

Political offices
Preceded by Ernest Constans	Minister of the Interior; 1890	Succeeded by Ernest Constans
Preceded by Armand Fallières	Minister of Public Instruction and Fine Arts; 1890–1892	Succeeded by Charles Dupuy
Preceded by Louis Ricard	Minister of Justice; 1892–1893	Succeeded by Jules Develle
Preceded by Jules Develle	Minister of Justice; 1893	Succeeded by Eugène Guérin
Preceded by Alexandre Ribot	Prime Minister of France; 1895–1896	Succeeded by Jules Méline
Preceded by Georges Leygues	Minister of the Interior; 1895–1896	Succeeded by Ferdinand Sarrien
Preceded by Marcelin Berthelot	Minister of Foreign Affairs; 1896	Succeeded by Gabriel Hanotaux
Preceded by Alfred Rambaud	Minister of Public Instruction and Fine Arts; 1898	Succeeded by Georges Leygues
Preceded by Paul Deschanel	President of the Chamber of Deputies; 1902–1904	Succeeded by Henri Brisson
Preceded by Maurice Rouvier	Minister of Foreign Affairs; 1906	Succeeded by Stéphen Pichon
Preceded by René Renoult	Minister of Labour and Social Security; 1912–1913	Succeeded by René Besnard
Preceded by Gaston Doumergue	Minister of Foreign Affairs; 1914	Succeeded by René Viviani
Preceded by —	Minister of State; 1915–1916	Succeeded by —
Preceded by Étienne Clémentel	Minister of Labour and Social Security; 1917	Succeeded by André Renard
Preceded by —	Minister of State; 1917	Succeeded by —
Preceded by Antonin Dubost	President of the Senate; 1920–1923	Succeeded by Gaston Doumergue
