= Charles Dupuy =

French politician (1851–1923)

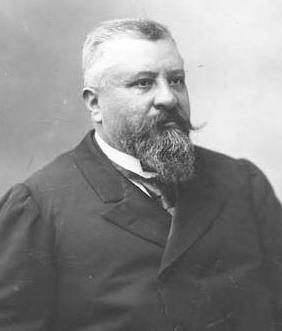

Prime Minister of France
- In office 4 April 1893 – 3 December 1893
- President: Sadi Carnot
- Preceded by: Alexandre Ribot
- Succeeded by: Jean Casimir-Perier
- In office 30 May 1894 – 26 January 1895
- President: Sadi Carnot; Himself (Acting); Jean Casimir-Perier; Himself (Acting); Félix Faure
- Preceded by: Jean Casimir-Perier
- Succeeded by: Alexandre Ribot
- In office 1 November 1898 – 22 June 1899
- President: Félix Faure; Himself (Acting); Émile Loubet
- Preceded by: Henri Brisson
- Succeeded by: Pierre Waldeck-Rousseau

Acting President of France
- In office 25 June – 27 June 1894
- Preceded by: Sadi Carnot
- Succeeded by: Jean Casimir-Perier
- In office 16 January – 17 January 1895
- Preceded by: Jean Casimir-Perier
- Succeeded by: Félix Faure
- In office 16 February – 18 February 1899
- Preceded by: Félix Faure
- Succeeded by: Émile Loubet

Personal details
- Born: 5 November 1851 Le Puy-en-Velay, Second Republic of France
- Died: 23 July 1923 (aged 71) Ille-sur-Têt, Third Republic of France
- Party: Progressive Republicans
- Spouse: Antoinette Laborde

Charles Alexandre Dupuy (French: [ʃaʁl dypɥi]; 5 November 1851 – 23 July 1923) was a French statesman, three times prime minister.

== Biography ==
He was born in Le Puy-en-Velay, Haute-Loire, Auvergne, where his father was a minor official. After a period as a professor of philosophy in the provinces, he was appointed a school inspector, thus obtaining a practical acquaintance with the needs of French education. In 1885 he was elected to the chamber as an Opportunist Republican. After acting as "reporter" of the budget for public instruction, he became minister for the department, in Alexandre Ribot's cabinet, in 1892. In April 1893 he formed a ministry himself, taking as his office that of minister of the interior, but resigned at the end of November, and on 5 December was elected president of the chamber. During his first week of office an anarchist, Vaillant, who had managed to gain admission to the chamber, threw a bomb at the president, and Dupuy's calm response --"Messieurs, la séance continue" – gained him much credit.

In May 1894 he again became premier and minister of the interior; and he was at President Carnot's side when Carnot was stabbed to death at Lyons in June. He then stood for the presidency, but was defeated, and his cabinet remained in office till January 1895; under this government, Alfred Dreyfus was arrested and condemned (23 December 1894). The progress of the Dreyfus Affair cast its shadow over Dupuy, along with other French "ministrables," but in November 1898, after Henri Brisson had at last remitted the case to the judgment of the court of cassation, he formed a cabinet of Republican concentration.

During Dupuy's terms as prime minister, a number of progressive reforms were carried out. A health and safety law was passed in June 1893, and in July 1893 a Free Medical Assistance Law was passed, which established the principle (as noted by one study) “that access to medical care was a fundamental right.” A law implemented in June 1894 introduced a form of social insurance through a mutual fund for miners' welfare and retirement. A law passed in November 1894 introduced the Credit Agricole mutualist savings bank for farmers. A law passed that same month set out the role of the state-owned Caisse des depots "in the construction and management of subsidised housing". A law of November the 30th 1894 granted credit facilities and tax exemptions to low-cost housing companies. and a law on the attachment of wages was introduced on the 12th of January 1895. In March 1899 a new rural credit law was introduced.

In view of the apparent likelihood that the judges of the criminal division of the court of cassation—who formed the ordinary tribunal for such an appeal—would decide in favour of Dreyfus, it was thought that Dupuy's new cabinet would be strong enough to reconcile public opinion to such a result; but, to the surprise of outside observers, Dupuy proposed a law in the chamber transferring the decision to a full court of all the divisions of the court of cassation. This arbitrary act, though adopted by the chamber, was construed as a fresh attempt to maintain the judgment of the first court-martial. In the interim, President Félix Faure (an anti-Dreyfusard) died, and the accession of Émile Loubet helped placate the public. The whole court of cassation decided that there must be a new court-martial, and Dupuy at once resigned (June 1899). Although none of Dupuy's presidential bids were successful, he served, due to his position as Prime Minister, as an Acting President of the French Republic for three separate occasions during vacancies.

In June 1900 Dupuy was elected senator for the Haute-Loire department. He was reelected on 7 January 1906 and 11 January 1920, holding office until his death on 23 July 1923.

== Dupuy's first ministry, 4 April 1893 – 3 December 1893 ==
- Charles Dupuy – President of the Council and Minister of the Interior
- Jules Develle – Minister of Foreign Affairs
- Julien Léon Loizillon – Minister of War
- Paul Peytral – Minister of Finance
- Eugène Guérin – Minister of Justice
- Louis Terrier – Minister of Commerce, Industry, and Colonies
- Auguste Alfred Lefèvre – Minister of Marine
- Raymond Poincaré – Minister of Public Instruction, Fine Arts, and Worship
- Albert Viger – Minister of Agriculture
- Jules Viette – Minister of Public Works

== Dupuy's second ministry, 30 May 1894 – 26 January 1895 ==
- Charles Dupuy – President of the Council and Minister of the Interior and of Worship
- Gabriel Hanotaux – Minister of Foreign Affairs
- Auguste Mercier – Minister of War
- Raymond Poincaré – Minister of Finance
- Eugène Guérin – Minister of Justice
- Félix Faure – Minister of Marine
- Georges Leygues – Minister of Public Instruction and Fine Arts
- Albert Viger – Minister of Agriculture
- Théophile Delcassé – Minister of Colonies
- Louis Barthou – Minister of Public Works
- Victor Lourties – Minister of Commerce and Industry and of Posts and Telegraphs

== Dupuy's third ministry, 1 November 1898 – 22 June 1899 ==
- Charles Dupuy – President of the Council and Minister of the Interior and Worship
- Théophile Delcassé – Minister of Foreign Affairs
- Charles de Freycinet – Minister of War
- Paul Peytral – Minister of Finance
- Georges Lebret – Minister of Justice
- Édouard Locroy – Minister of Marine
- Georges Leygues – Minister of Public Instruction and Fine Arts
- Albert Viger – Minister of Agriculture
- Florent Guillain – Minister of Colonies
- Camille Krantz – Minister of Public Works
- Paul Delombre – Minister of Commerce and Industry and of Posts and Telegraphs

Changes

- 6 May 1899 – Camille Krantz succeeds Freycinet as Minister of War. Jean Monestier succeeds Krantz as Minister of Public Works.

Political offices
Preceded by Alexandre Ribot	Prime Minister of France; 1893	Succeeded by Jean Casimir-Perier
Preceded by Jean Casimir-Perier	Prime Minister of France; 1894–1895	Succeeded by Alexandre Ribot
Preceded by Henri Brisson	Prime Minister of France; 1898–1899	Succeeded by Pierre Waldeck-Rousseau
