= Charles de Freycinet =

French statesman and Prime Minister (1828–1923)

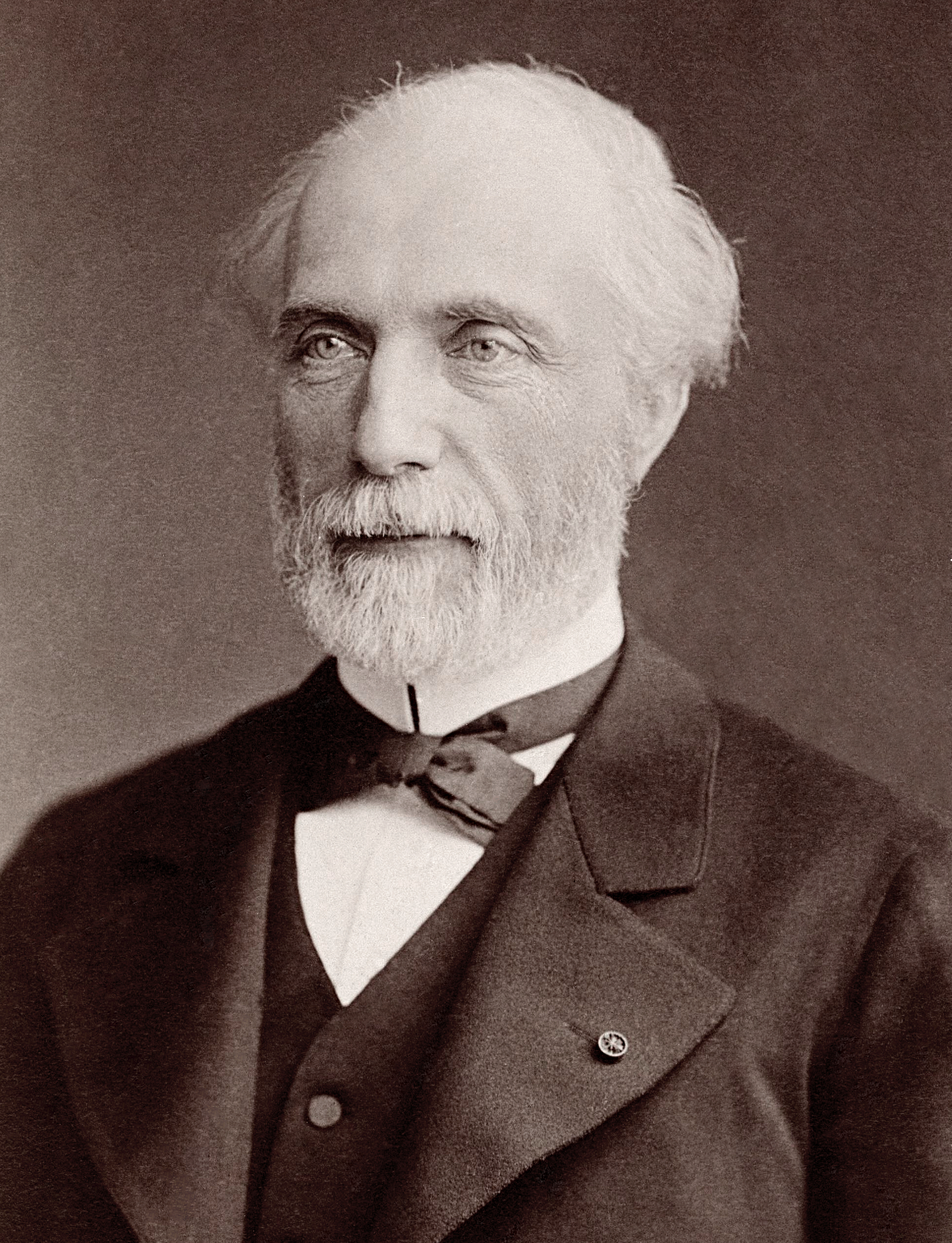
- Freycinet (c. 1880) by Nadar

Minister of War
- In office 1 November 1898 – 18 February 1899
- Prime Minister: Charles Dupuy
- Preceded by: Charles Chanoine
- Succeeded by: Camille Krantz
- In office 3 April 1888 – 10 January 1893
- Prime Minister: Charles Floquet; Pierre Tirard; Himself; Émile Loubet; Alexandre Ribot
- Preceded by: François Logerot
- Succeeded by: Julien Loizillon

Prime Minister of France
- In office 17 March 1890 – 27 February 1892
- President: Sadi Carnot
- Preceded by: Pierre Tirard
- Succeeded by: Émile Loubet
- In office 7 January 1886 – 16 December 1886
- President: Jules Grévy
- Preceded by: Henri Brisson
- Succeeded by: René Goblet
- In office 30 January 1882 – 7 August 1882
- President: Jules Grévy
- Preceded by: Léon Gambetta
- Succeeded by: Charles Duclerc
- In office 28 December 1879 – 23 September 1880
- President: Jules Grévy
- Preceded by: William Waddington
- Succeeded by: Jules Ferry

Minister of Foreign Affairs
- In office 28 December 1879 – 3 December 1886
- Prime Minister: Himself; Henri Brisson
- Preceded by: Paul-Armand Challemel-Lacour
- Succeeded by: Émile Flourens

Minister of Public Works
- In office 13 December 1877 – 28 December 1879
- Prime Minister: Jules Dufaure; William Waddington
- Preceded by: Michel Graeff
- Succeeded by: Henri Varroy

Member of the French Senate for Seine
- In office 30 January 1876 – 11 January 1920
- Succeeded by: Louis Dausset

Personal details
- Born: 14 November 1828 Foix, Ariège, France
- Died: 14 May 1923 (aged 94) Paris, France
- Party: Republican Union (1871–1885); Union of the Lefts (1885–1894); League of Patriots (1894–1923)
- Spouse: Jeanne Alexandrine Bosc (m. 1858; died 1923)
- Education: École Polytechnique
- Profession: Engineer
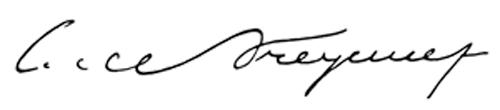
- Signature

Charles Louis de Saulces de Freycinet (French: [ʃaʁl də fʁɛjsinɛ]; 14 November 1828 – 14 May 1923) was a French statesman who served four times as Prime Minister during the Third Republic. He also served an important term as Minister of War (1888–1893). He belonged to the Moderate Republican faction.

He was elected a member of the Academy of Sciences, and in 1890, the fourteenth member to occupy a seat in the Académie Française.

== Biography ==
=== Early years ===
Freycinet was born at Foix (Ariège) of a Protestant family and was the nephew of Louis de Freycinet, a French navigator and the grandson of Élisabeth-Antoinette-Catherine Armand, a French pastellist. Charles Freycinet was educated at the École Polytechnique. He entered government service as a mining engineer (see X-Mines). In 1858 he was appointed traffic manager to the Compagnie de chemins de fer du Midi, a post in which he showed a remarkable talent for organization, and in 1862 returned to the engineering service, attaining in 1886 the rank of inspector-general. He was sent on several special scientific missions, including one to the United Kingdom, on which he wrote Mémoire sur le travail des femmes et des enfants dans les manufactures de l'Angleterre (1867).

=== Franco-Prussian War ===
In July 1870 the Franco-Prussian War started, which led to the fall of the Second French Empire of Napoleon III. On the establishment of the Third Republic in September 1870, he offered his services to Léon Gambetta, was appointed prefect of the department of Tarn-et-Garonne, and in October became chief of the military cabinet. It was mainly Freycinet's powers of organization which enabled Gambetta to raise army after army to oppose the invading Germans. He revealed himself to be a competent strategist, but the policy of dictating operations to the generals in the field was not accompanied by happy results. The friction between him and General d'Aurelle de Paladines resulted in the loss of the advantage temporarily gained at Coulmiers and Orléans, and he was responsible for the campaign in the east, which ended in the destruction of the Armée de l'Est of Charles Denis Bourbaki.

=== 1871-1888 ===
In 1871 he published a defence of his administration under the title of La Guerre en province pendant le siège de Paris. He entered the Senate in 1876 as a follower of Gambetta, and in December 1877 became Minister of Public Works in the cabinet of Jules Armand Stanislaus Dufaure. He passed a great scheme for the gradual acquisition of the railways by the state and the construction of new lines at a cost of three milliards of francs, and for the development of the canal system at a further cost of one milliard. He retained his post in the ministry of William Henry Waddington, whom he succeeded in December 1879 as Prime Minister and Minister for Foreign Affairs. He passed an amnesty for the Communards, but in attempting to steer a middle course (between the Catholics and the anti-clericalists) on the question of religious associations, he lost Gambetta's support, and resigned in September 1880.

In January 1882 he again became Prime Minister and Foreign Minister. The reluctance of the French parliament to join Britain in the bombardment of Alexandria was the death-knell of French influence in Egypt and Freycinet was criticized for it. He attempted to compromise by occupying the Isthmus of Suez, but the vote of credit was rejected in the Chamber by 417 votes to 75, and the ministry resigned. He returned to office in April 1885 as Foreign Minister in Henri Brisson's cabinet, and retained that post when, in January 1886, he succeeded to the premiership.

=== Premiership ===
He came to power with an ambitious programme of internal reform; but apart from settling the question of the exiled pretenders, his successes were chiefly in the sphere of colonial extension. In spite of his unrivalled skill as a parliamentary tactician, he failed to keep his party together, and was defeated on 3 December 1886. In the following year, after two unsuccessful attempts to construct new ministries, he stood for the Presidency of the Republic; but the radicals, to whom his opportunism was distasteful, turned the scale against him by transferring their votes to Marie François Sadi Carnot.

During his premierships, a number of progressive reforms were introduced. A law of July the 13th 1896 broadened (as noted by one study) “the conditions for pension bonuses offered by the State” while a law of July the 20th 1886 provided for bonuses (as one study has noted) “in cases of serious injury or officially recognized disability resulting in total incapacity for work.” A law was introduced in July 1890 that regulated the semi-monthly inspection of mines with the object (as noted by one study) “of examining the conditions of security for the employees.” A law of July 1890 allowed for elected miners to inspect mines, and a law of December 1890 allowed workers to demand damages from employers who dismissed them due to their belonging to a union. In addition, the ‘livret,’ a long-established document that placed arbitrary restrictions on laborers, was abolished on July the 22nd 1890, and a law of July the 20th 1891 set up a bureau of labor which was given the duty (as noted by one study) “to collect, systematize, and publish all information relating to labor, particularly as regards the state and development of production, the organization and renumeration of labor, its relations with capital, the condition of the working people, and the comparative situation of labor in France and in foreign countries.”

==== Minister of War ====
In April 1888 he became Minister of War in Charles Floquet's cabinet – the first civilian since 1848 to hold that office. His services to France in this capacity were the crowning achievement of his life, and he enjoyed the conspicuous honour of holding his office without a break for five years through as many successive administrations – those of Floquet and Pierre Tirard, his own fourth ministry (March 1890 – February 1892), and the Émile Loubet and Alexandre Ribot ministries. The introduction of the three-years' service and the establishment of a general staff, a supreme council of war, and the army commands were all due to him. His premiership was marked by heated debates on the clerical question, and it was a hostile vote on his bill against the religious associations that caused the fall of his cabinet. He failed to clear himself entirely of complicity in the Panama scandals, and in January 1893 resigned the Ministry of War.

In November 1898 he once again became Minister of War in the Charles Dupuy cabinet, but resigned office on 6 May 1899.

=== Prime Minister of France ===
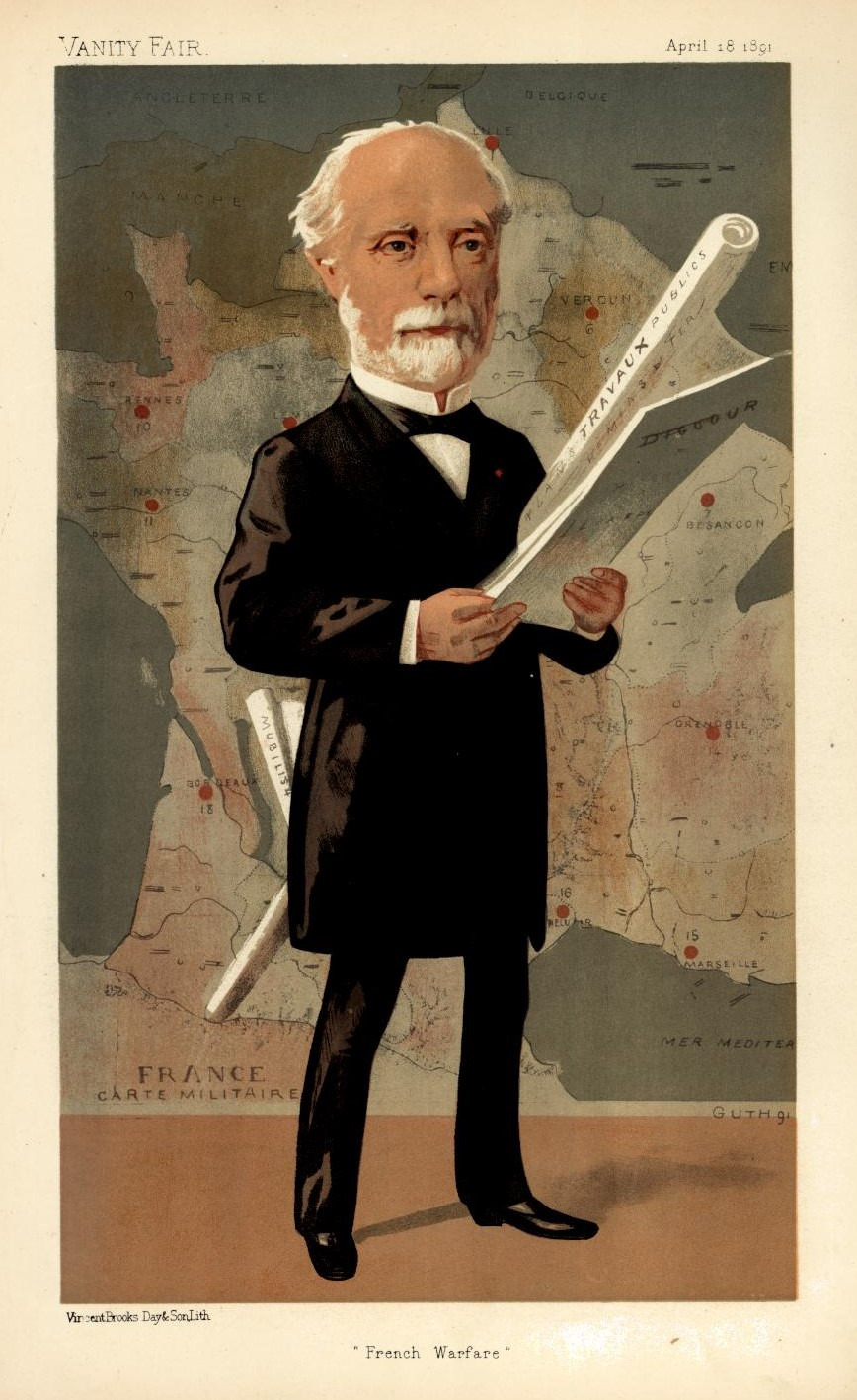
Freycinet by Guth in Vanity Fair, April 1891

==== 1st Ministry ====
- Charles de Freycinet – President of the Council and Minister of Foreign Affairs
- Jean Joseph Frédéric Farre – Minister of War
- Charles Lepère – Minister of the Interior and Worship
- Pierre Magnin – Minister of Finance
- Jules Cazot – Minister of Justice
- Jean Bernard Jauréguiberry – Minister of Marine and Colonies
- Jules Ferry – Minister of Public Instruction and Fine Arts
- Henri Varroy – Minister of Public Works
- Adolphe Cochery – Minister of Posts and Telegraphs
- Pierre Tirard – Minister of Agriculture and Commerce

Changes

- 17 May 1880 – Ernest Constans succeeds Lepère as Minister of the Interior and Worship.

==== 2nd Ministry ====
- Charles de Freycinet – President of the Council and Minister of Foreign Affairs
- Jean-Baptiste Billot – Minister of War
- René Goblet – Minister of the Interior
- Léon Say – Minister of Finance
- Gustave Humbert – Minister of Justice and Worship
- Jean Bernard Jauréguiberry – Minister of Marine and Colonies
- Jules Ferry – Minister of Public Instruction and Fine Arts
- François de Mahy – Minister of Agriculture
- Henri Varroy – Minister of Public Works
- Adolphe Cochery – Minister of Posts and Telegraphs
- Pierre Tirard – Minister of Commerce

==== 3rd Ministry ====
- Charles de Freycinet – President of the Council and Minister of Foreign Affairs
- Georges Boulanger – Minister of War
- Ferdinand Sarrien – Minister of the Interior
- Marie François Sadi Carnot – Minister of Finance
- Charles Demôle – Minister of Justice
- Théophile Aube – Minister of Marine and Colonies
- René Goblet – Minister of Public Instruction, Fine Arts, and Worship
- Jules Develle – Minister of Agriculture
- Charles Baïhaut – Minister of Public Works
- Félix Granet – Minister of Posts and Telegraphs
- Édouard Locroy – Minister of Commerce and Industry

Changes

- 4 November 1886 – Édouard Millaud succeeds Baïhaut as Minister of Public Works

==== 4th Ministry ====
- Charles de Freycinet – President of the Council and Minister of War
- Alexandre Ribot – Minister of Foreign Affairs
- Ernest Constans – Minister of the Interior
- Maurice Rouvier – Minister of Finance
- Armand Fallières – Minister of Justice and Worship
- Jules Roche – Minister of the Colonies and of Commerce and Industry
- Édouard Barbey – Minister of Marine
- Léon Bourgeois – Minister of Public Instruction and Fine Arts
- Jules Develle – Minister of Agriculture
- Yves Guyot – Minister of Public Works

== Publications ==
- Traité de mécanique rationnelle (1858)
- De l'analyse infinitésimale (1860, revised ed., 1881)
- Des pentes économiques en chemin de fer (1861)
- Emploi des eaux d'égout en agriculture (1869)
- Principes de l'assainissement des villes (1870)
- Traité d'assainissement industriel (1870)
- Essai sur la philosophie des sciences (1896)
- La Question d'Égypte (1905)
- Contemporain: Pensées contributed under the pseudonym of Alceste"

Political offices
Preceded by Michel Graëff	Minister of Public Works; 1877–1879	Succeeded by Henri Varroy
Preceded by William Waddington	Prime Minister of France; 1879–1880	Succeeded by Jules Ferry
Preceded by William Waddington	Minister of Foreign Affairs; 1879–1880	Succeeded by Jules Barthélemy-Saint-Hilaire
Preceded by Léon Gambetta	Prime Minister of France; 1882	Succeeded by Charles Duclerc
Preceded by Léon Gambetta	Minister of Foreign Affairs; 1882	Succeeded by Charles Duclerc
Preceded by Jules Ferry	Minister of Foreign Affairs; 1885–1886	Succeeded by Émile Flourens
Preceded by Henri Brisson	Prime Minister of France; 1886	Succeeded by René Goblet
Preceded by François Auguste Logerot	Minister of War; 1888–1893	Succeeded by Julien Léon Loizillon
Preceded by Pierre Tirard	Prime Minister of France; 1890–1892	Succeeded by Émile Loubet
Preceded by Charles Chanoine	Minister of War; 1898–1899	Succeeded by Camille Krantz
Preceded by —	Minister of State; 1915–1916	Succeeded by —
