= Alexandre Ribot =

French politician (1842–1923)

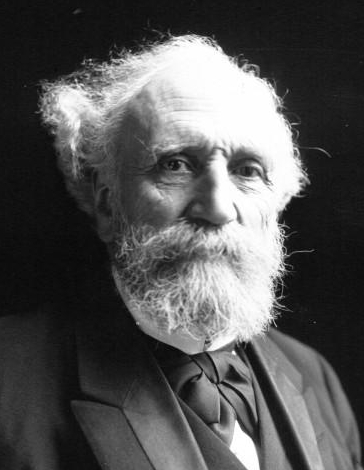
- Ribot in 1913

Prime Minister of France
- In office 20 March 1917 – 12 September 1917
- President: Raymond Poincaré
- Preceded by: Aristide Briand
- Succeeded by: Paul Painlevé
- In office 9 June 1914 – 13 June 1914
- President: Raymond Poincaré
- Preceded by: Gaston Doumergue
- Succeeded by: René Viviani
- In office 26 January 1895 – 1 November 1895
- President: Félix Faure
- Preceded by: Charles Dupuy
- Succeeded by: Léon Bourgeois
- In office 6 December 1892 – 4 April 1893
- President: Sadi Carnot
- Preceded by: Émile Loubet
- Succeeded by: Charles Dupuy

Personal details
- Born: Alexandre-Félix-Joseph Ribot; 7 February 1842 Saint-Omer, Kingdom of France
- Died: 13 January 1923 (aged 80) Paris, France
- Party: Independent
- Spouse: Mary Weld Burch

Alexandre-Félix-Joseph Ribot (English: /riːˈboʊ/ ree-BOH, French: [alɛksɑ̃dʁ ʁibo]; 7 February 1842 – 13 January 1923) was a French politician and four-time Prime Minister of France.

== Early life and early career ==
Ribot was born on 7 February 1842, in Saint-Omer. After graduating from the University of Paris, where he was lauréat of the faculty of law, he was admitted to the bar. He was secretary of the conference of advocates and one of the founders of the Sociéte de legislation comparée. In 1875 and 1876, he was director of criminal affairs and secretary-general at the ministry of justice.

== Representative ==
In 1877, he entered politics, becoming a member of the committee of legal resistance during the Broglie ministry; in 1878, he returned to the chamber as a moderate republican member for Boulogne, in his native département of Pas-de-Calais.

His impassioned yet reasoned eloquence gave him an influence which was increased by his articles in the Parlement in which he opposed violent measures against the unauthorized congregations. He devoted himself especially to financial questions, and in 1882 was reporter of the budget. He became one of the most prominent republican opponents of the Radical party, distinguishing himself by his attacks on the short-lived Gambetta ministry. He refused to vote the credits demanded by the Ferry cabinet for the Tonkin expedition, and helped Georges Clemenceau overthrow the ministry in 1885. At the general election of that year he was a victim of the Republican rout in the Pas-de-Calais, and did not re-enter the chamber until 1887.

== Cabinet member and premier ==
After 1889, he sat for Saint-Omer. His fear of the Boulangist movement converted him to the policy of "Republican Concentration," and he entered office in 1890 as foreign minister in the Freycinet cabinet. He was named for his speeches and negotiation skills, such as in 1891, where his diplomacy led to the Franco-Russian Alliance. He retained his post in Émile Loubet's ministry (February–November 1892), and on its defeat he became president of the council (prime minister), retaining the direction of foreign affairs. The government resigned in March 1893 over the refusal of the chamber to accept the Senate's amendments to the budget. On the election of Félix Faure as president of the Republic in January 1895, Ribot was reappointed premier and minister of finance. On 10 June, he made the first official announcement of a definite alliance with Russia. On 30 October, due to mismanagement of the Second Madagascar expedition, the government was defeated, and he, along with all other government officials, resigned. During his premiership, a law was introduced on December the 27th 1892 on conciliation and optional arbitration in collective disputes between employers and workers or employees. This sought, as noted by one study, “to establish procedures for the peaceful settlement of collective labor disputes.”

After the fall of Jules Méline's ministry in 1898, Ribot tried in vain to form a cabinet of "conciliation." Ar the end of 1898, he was elected president of the commission of education, where he advocated for secular education; religious teaching policies from Pierre Waldeck-Rousseau on the religious teaching congregations split the Republican party, and Ribot was among the seceders.

In 1902, Ribot was elected the minister of Foreign Affairs. While in tenue, he canceled the Egypt's debt to France, at the cost of accessing its natural resources. It was likely backed by his personal motivations.

An adversary to the anti-clerical Combes, he helped bring about the fall of his cabinet, on 13 January 1905. Though, he recognized its improvements from the Concordat of 1801, and supported its Associations culturelles.

He was re-elected deputy for Saint-Omer in 1906, and the same year, he became a member of the Académie Française in succession to the duc d'Audiffret-Pasquier. He was already a member of the Academy of Moral and Political Science. In justification of his policy in opposition, he published in 1905 two volumes of his Discours politiques.

On 3 January 1909, Ribot was elected a member of the French Senate, and in February 1910, he was offered the Ministry for Foreign Affairs in the Monis cabinet, which he refused. After the formation of the Poincaré Government on 14 January 1912, Ribot took the place of Léon Bourgeois as president of the committee appointed to deal with the Franco-German treaty, which he went on to help negotiate. In 1913, he was an unsuccessful candidate for the presidency of the Republic, and on the fall of Louis Barthou's Government was invited by Poincaré, who was now President, to form a Cabinet, which he refused. In 1914, he became, with Jean Dupuy, leader of the Left Republican group which refused to accept the decisions of the Radical Socialist congress at Pau in October 1913.

On 9 June 1914, Ribot became Prime Minister and Minister of Justice, but ended on 10 June.

== World War I ==
On 27 August 1914, during World War I, Ribot became Minister of Finance in Viviani's Ministry of National Defence, an office which he retained when, on 28 October 1915, Aristide Briand succeeded Viviani as Prime Minister.

On 7 February 1916, Ribot visited London and held a conference with the Chancellor of the Exchequer at the Treasury. When Briand reconstituted his Cabinet in December 1916, Ribot retained his position. On the fall of the Briand Ministry, President Poincaré appointed him as Prime Minister. On 21 March, he declared his goals to be "to recover the provinces torn from us in the past, to obtain the reparations and guarantees due to France, and to prepare a durable peace based on respect for the rights and liberty of peoples". On 31 July, in a reply to the German Chancellor Georg Michaelis, he admitted that in 1917 an agreement had been made with Tsar Nicholas to erect the German territories on the left bank of the Rhine into an autonomous state, but denied that there had been any question of their annexation to France.

Following the decision to dismiss Interior Minister Louis Malvy, his government resigned office on 2 September, but he accepted the Ministry of Foreign Affairs in the Painlevé cabinet constituted six days later. He resigned office finally on 16 October, owing to the violent criticism of his refusal to fall into the "trap" of German peace offers.

== Death and legacy ==
Ribot left politics, and died in Paris on 13 January 1923, aged 80. The Lycée Alexandre Ribot grammar school is named for him.

While serving as Prime Minister, an inquiry into workers' housing was launched in July 1895, while a decree of September 1895 provided for (as noted by one study) “the creation of local committees for low-cost housing.” In addition, on December the 27th 1892, a law on conciliation and arbitration was passed which was put forth (as noted by one study) “as a popular measure in favor of the working people.”

== Cabinets ==
Ribot's 1st Ministry, 6 December 1892 – 11 January 1893

- Alexandre Ribot – President of the Council and Minister of Foreign Affairs
- Charles de Freycinet – Minister of War
- Émile Loubet – Minister of the Interior
- Maurice Rouvier – Minister of Finance
- Léon Bourgeois – Minister of Justice
- Auguste Burdeau – Minister of Marine and Colonies
- Charles Dupuy – Minister of Public Instruction, Fine Arts, and Worship
- Jules Develle – Minister of Agriculture
- Jules Viette – Minister of Public Works
- Jules Siegfried – Minister of Commerce and Industry

Changes

- 13 December 1892 – Pierre Tirard succeeds Rouvier as Minister of Finance.

Ribot's 2nd Ministry, 11 January 1893 – 4 April 1893

- Alexandre Ribot – President of the Council and Minister of the Interior
- Jules Develle – Minister of Foreign Affairs
- Julien Léon Loizillon – Minister of War
- Pierre Tirard – Minister of Finance
- Léon Bourgeois – Minister of Justice
- Adrien Barthélemy Louis Henri Rieunier – Minister of Marine
- Charles Dupuy – Minister of Public Instruction, Fine Arts, and Worship
- Albert Viger – Minister of Agriculture
- Jules Siegfried – Minister of Commerce, Industry, and the Colonies

Ribot's 3rd Ministry, 26 January 1895 – 1 November 1895

- Alexandre Ribot – President of the Council and Minister of Finance
- Gabriel Hanotaux – Minister of Foreign Affairs
- Émile Zurlinden – Minister of War
- Georges Leygues – Minister of the Interior
- Ludovic Trarieux – Minister of Justice
- Armand Louis Charles Gustave Besnard – Minister of Marine
- Raymond Poincaré – Minister of Public Instruction, Fine Arts, and Worship
- Antoine Gadaud – Minister of Agriculture
- Émile Chautemps – Minister of Colonies
- Ludovic Dupuy-Dutemps – Minister of Public Works
- André Lebon – Minister of Posts and Telegraphs and Minister of Commerce and Industry

Ribot's 4th Ministry, 9 June 1914 – 13 June 1914

- Alexandre Ribot – President of the Council and Minister of Justice
- Léon Bourgeois – Minister of Foreign Affairs
- Théophile Delcassé – Minister of War
- Paul Peytral – Minister of the Interior
- Étienne Clémentel – Minister of Finance
- Jean-Baptiste Abel – Minister of Labour and Social Security Provisions
- Émile Chautemps – Minister of Marine
- Arthur Dessoye – Minister of Public Instruction and Fine Arts
- Adrien Dariac – Minister of Agriculture
- Maurice Maunoury – Minister of Colonies
- Jean Dupuy – Minister of Public Works
- Marc Réville – Minister of Posts and Telegraphs and Minister of Commerce and Industry

Ribot's 5th Ministry, 20 March 1917 – 12 September 1917

- Alexandre Ribot – President of the Council and Minister of Foreign Affairs
- Paul Painlevé – Minister of War
- Louis Malvy – Minister of the Interior
- Joseph Thierry – Minister of Finance
- Albert Thomas – Minister of Armaments and War Manufacturing
- Léon Bourgeois – Minister of Labour and Social Security Provisions
- René Viviani – Minister of Justice
- Lucien Lacaze – Minister of Marine
- Théodore Steeg – Minister of Public Instruction and Fine Arts
- Fernand David – Minister of Agriculture
- Maurice Viollette – Minister of General Supply and Maritime Transports
- André Maginot – Minister of Colonies
- Georges Desplas – Minister of Public Works and Transport
- Étienne Clémentel – Minister of Posts and Telegraphs and Minister of Commerce and Industry

Changes

- 4 July 1917 – The office of Minister of Maritime Transports is abolished. Maurice Viollette remains Minister of General Supply.
- 10 August 1917 – Charles Chaumet succeeds Lacaze as Minister of Marine.
- 1 September 1917 – Théodore Steeg succeeds Malvy as Minister of the Interior

Political offices
Preceded by Eugène Spuller	Minister of Foreign Affairs; 1890–1893	Succeeded by Jules Develle
Preceded by Émile Loubet	Prime Minister of France; 1892–1893	Succeeded by Charles Dupuy
Preceded by Émile Loubet	Minister of the Interior; 1893	Succeeded by Charles Dupuy
Preceded by Charles Dupuy	Prime Minister of France; 1895	Succeeded by Léon Bourgeois
Preceded by Raymond Poincaré	Minister of Finance; 1895	Succeeded by Paul Doumer
Preceded by Gaston Doumergue	Prime Minister of France; 1914	Succeeded by René Viviani
Preceded by Jean Bienvenu-Martin	Minister of Justice; 1914	Succeeded by Jean Bienvenu-Martin
Preceded by Joseph Noulens	Minister of Finance; 1914–1917	Succeeded by Joseph Thierry
Preceded by Aristide Briand	Prime Minister of France; 1917	Succeeded by Paul Painlevé
Preceded by Aristide Briand	Minister of Foreign Affairs; 1917	Succeeded by Louis Barthou
