= Louis Ricard =

French politician (1839–1921)

Louis Pierre Hippolyte Ricard
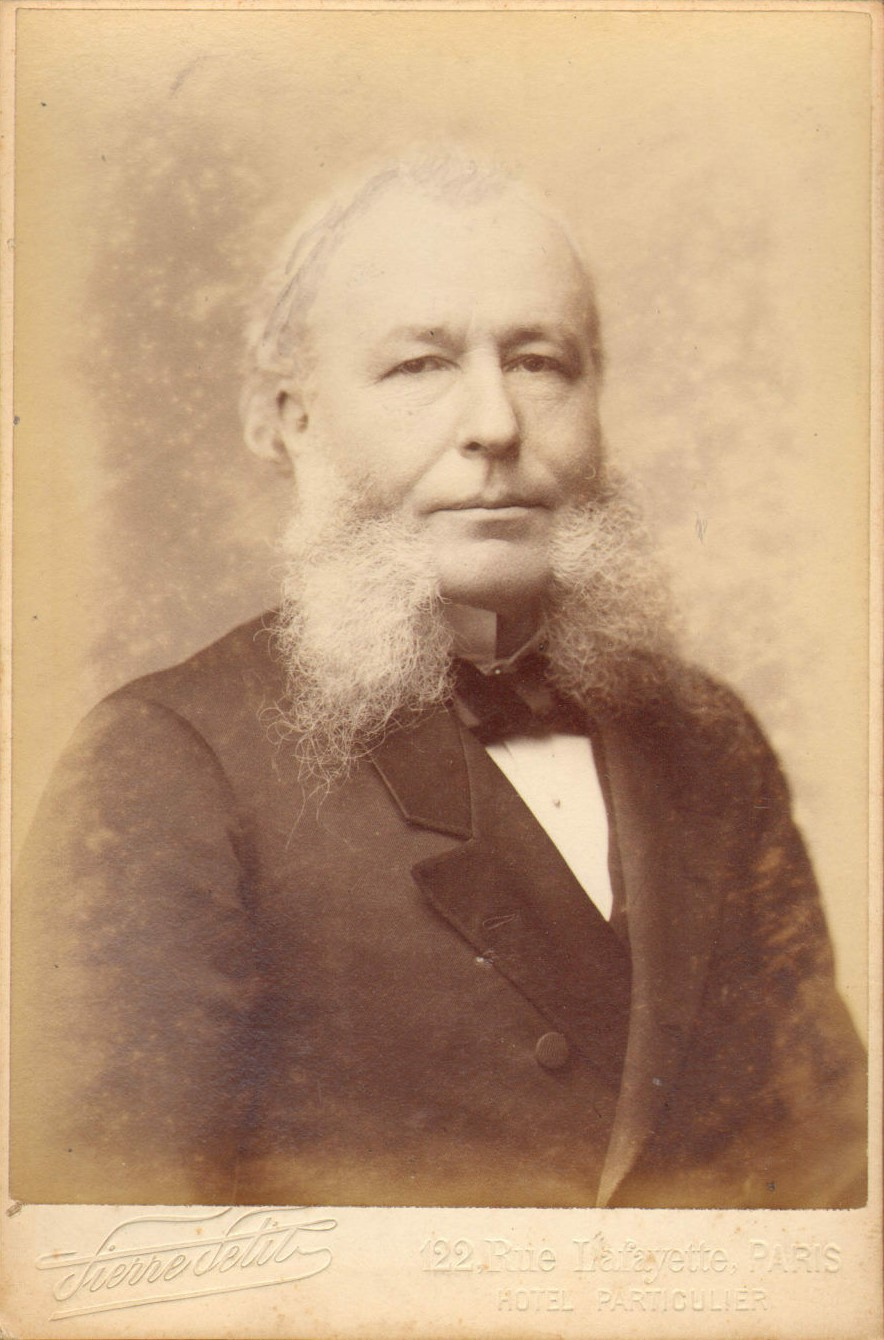

Minister of Justice and Religious Affairs
- In office 27 February 1892 – 6 December 1892
- Prime Minister: Émile Loubet
- Preceded by: Armand Fallières
- Succeeded by: Léon Bourgeois

Minister of Justice
- In office 1 November 1895 – 29 April 1896
- Prime Minister: Léon Bourgeois
- Preceded by: Ludovic Trarieux
- Succeeded by: Jean-Baptiste Darlan

Personal details
- Born: 17 March 1839 Caen, Calvados, France
- Died: 2 March 1921 (aged 81) Rouen, Seine-Maritime, France

Louis Pierre Hippolyte Ricard (17 March 1839 – 2 March 1921) was a wealthy French lawyer and liberal politician. He was Minister of Justice in 1892 and again in 1895–96. He is best known for steering through the 1898 law on workplace accidents.

== Early years (1839–1885) ==
Louis Pierre Hippolyte Ricard was born on 17 March 1839 in Caen, Calvados. His father was Paul Urban Ricard, a Caen hosiery manufacturer, and his mother was Marie-Caroline Rossignol. He grew up in a comfortable and rather conservative Catholic home. He studied law in Paris and joined the bar of Rouen in 1861. He became well known in the Rouen Court of Appeal.

In 1864, Ricard married Annette Gratienne Lesueur, a Protestant, daughter of a cotton manufacturer and niece of a major manufacturer of chemical products. They had one son. His wife brought him a large dowry, and also introduced him to what were then advanced political and social views. He became an anti-clerical Republican, and gradually moved towards a very liberal Protestantism. After his first wife died, he remarried to Berthe Renaud. In 1876 he moved into an opulent townhouse in Rouen.

On 13 November 1881, Ricard was elected to the municipal council on the Left list, and three days later was appointed mayor. He was elected to the general council of the department in 1882 for the fourth canton of Rouen. In April 1882, he was the first mayor of Rouen to be elected by the members of the council. He was a moderate Republican who later moved toward radicalism. During his term of office there were significant improvements in social and medical services in the city. A school for young girls was founded and the Theater of the Arts was rebuilt after a fire.

== National politics (1886–1902) ==
In the general elections of 4 October 1885 Ricard was elected deputy on the Republican list for the Seine-Inférieure. He resigned his municipal offices on 8 January 1886 when he entered the Chamber. He was succeeded as mayor of Rouen in 1886 by Maurice Lebon. Ricard sat with the Progressive Republican Left. Ricard did not run in the general election of 1889, but when the deputy for the first district of Rouen died he ran in the by-election of 1 December 1889 and won in the first round. He was reelected in the first round for the same constituency on 20 August 1893 and 8 May 1898. Ricard sat with the Progressive Republican Left in the Chamber.

Ricard became Minister of Justice and Religious Affairs when the cabinet of Émile Loubet was formed on 29 February 1892, and held office until 6 December 1892. He was again Minister of Justice in the cabinet of Léon Bourgeois from 1 November 1895 to 29 April 1896. He is best known as principal rapporteur of the law on workplace accidents on 1898. In 1900 he became a member of the Higher Council on Labor, and chaired the committee on industrial employment of women and children. He unexpectedly lost the legislative election of 27 April 1902.

== Later years (1902–1921) ==
After his electoral defeat Ricard retired from politics and returned to his career as an attorney. He was made an officer of the Legion of Honor in 1903 by General André. During World War I (1914–1918), in 1916 Ricard chaired the committee on regulating military construction companies. He died on 2 March 1921 in Rouen, Seine-Maritime, aged 81.

== Publications ==
Ricard published various legislative proposals and committee reports. Other publications include:

- Louis Ricard (1866). Location des plages de la mer. Étude juridique. Caen: Massif. Durand.
- Louis Ricard (3 November 1881). Des Devoirs des Magistrats. Cour d'Appel de Rouen.

== Sources ==
- Chaline, J.-P. (2000). "RICARD, Louis, Pierre, Hippolyte". In Jean-Pierre Chaline (ed.). Dictionnaire des parlementaires de Haute-Normandie sous la Troisième République, 1871-1940 (in French). Publication Univ Rouen Havre. ISBN 978-2-87775-669-3.
- Gueslin, André (1992). De la charité médiévale à la sécurité sociale: économie de la protection sociale du Moyen Age à l'époque contemporaine (in French). Editions de l'Atelier. ISBN 978-2-7082-2955-6.
- Jolly, Jean (1960–1977). "RICARD (Louis-Pierre-Hippolyte)". Dictionnaire des parlementaires français (1889–1940) (in French). Paris: Presses universitaires de France. ISBN 2-1100-1998-0.
- "Louis, Pierre RICARD". Sycomore (in French). Assemblée nationale.
- Robert, Adolphe; Cougny, Gaston (1889). "RICARD Louis-Pierre-Hippolyte" (PDF). Dictionnaire des parlementaires français (1889-1891) (in French). Vol. 5, de PLA à ZUY.
