= Félix Faure =

President of France from 1895 to 1899

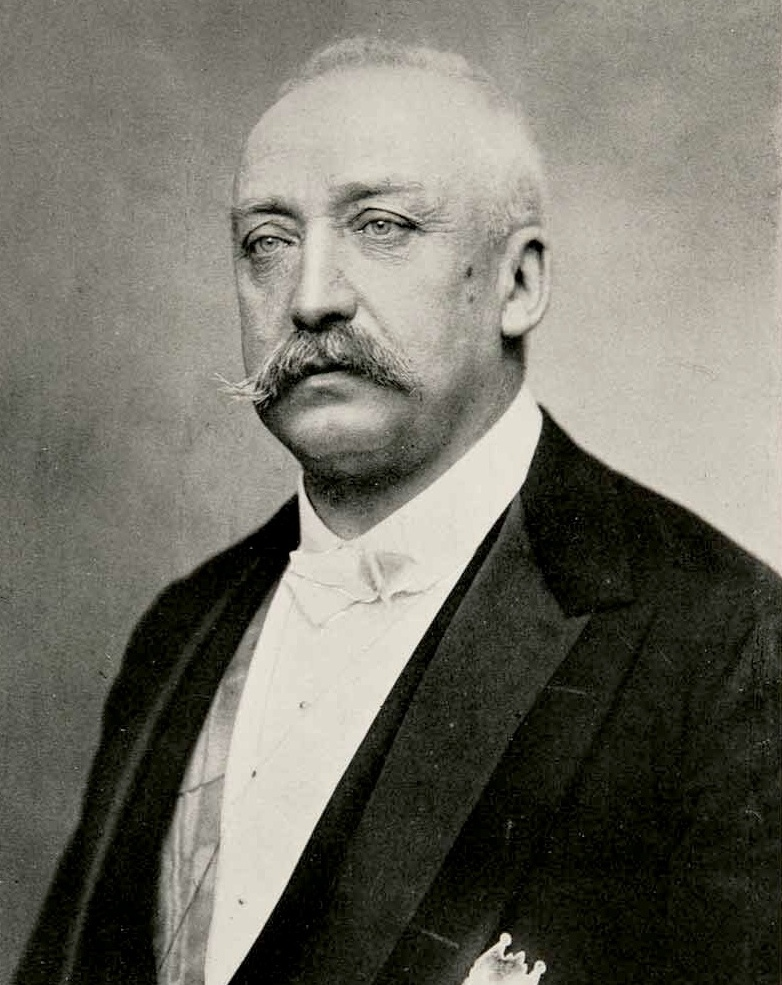
- Photograph by Nadar, c. 1895-99

President of France
- In office 17 January 1895 – 16 February 1899
- Prime Minister: Charles Dupuy; Alexandre Ribot; Léon Bourgeois; Jules Méline; Henri Brisson
- Preceded by: Jean Casimir-Perier
- Succeeded by: Émile Loubet

Personal details
- Born: Félix François Faure; 30 January 1841 10th arrondissement, Paris, Kingdom of France
- Died: 16 February 1899 (aged 58) Élysée Palace, Paris, French Third Republic
- Cause of death: Stroke
- Resting place: Père Lachaise Cemetery, Paris
- Party: Moderate Republicans

Félix François Faure (French: [feliks fʁɑ̃swa fɔʁ]; 30 January 1841 – 16 February 1899) was President of France from 1895 until his death in 1899. A native of Paris, he worked as a tanner in his younger years. Faure became a member of the Chamber of Deputies for Seine-Inférieure in 1881. He rose to prominence in national politics up until unexpectedly assuming the presidency, during which time France's relations with Russia improved.

According to David Bell, Felix Faure was born in Paris and moved to Le Havre where he became a successful shipowner. He moved up from local politics and was elected to the Chamber of Deputies in 1881. He started as a junior minister and became minister for marine and colonies. He was elected seventh president of the Third Republic in 1895 and died in office in 1899.

== Biography ==
Félix François Faure was born in Paris, the son of a maker of small furniture pieces Jean-Marie Faure (1809–1889) and his first wife, Rose Cuissard (1819–1852).

Having started as a tanner and merchant at Le Havre, Faure acquired considerable wealth, was elected to the National Assembly on 21 August 1881, and took his seat as a member of the Left, interesting himself chiefly in matters concerning economics, railways and the navy. Having remarked himself as an able politician and administrator while in the Chamber of Deputies, he was made under-secretary for the colonies in Ferry's ministry in November 1882, and retained that post till 1885. During this period, he would maintain friendly relations with the minister of the navy, and was able to obtain a significant degree of initiative. He held the same post in Tirard's ministry in 1888, and in 1893 was made vice-president of the chamber.

In 1894, he obtained cabinet rank as minister of marine in the administration of Charles Dupuy. In the following January, he was unexpectedly elected President of the Republic upon the resignation of President Casimir-Perier. The principal cause of his elevation was the determination of the various sections of the moderate republican party to exclude Henri Brisson, who had had a plurality of votes on the first ballot, but had failed to obtain an absolute majority. To accomplish this end, it was necessary to unite the party, and such unity could be secured only by the nomination of someone who offended no one. Faure answered this description exactly.

He granted amnesty to the anarchist movements in 1895, enabling the return from exile in England of several famous anarchists, such as Émile Pouget.

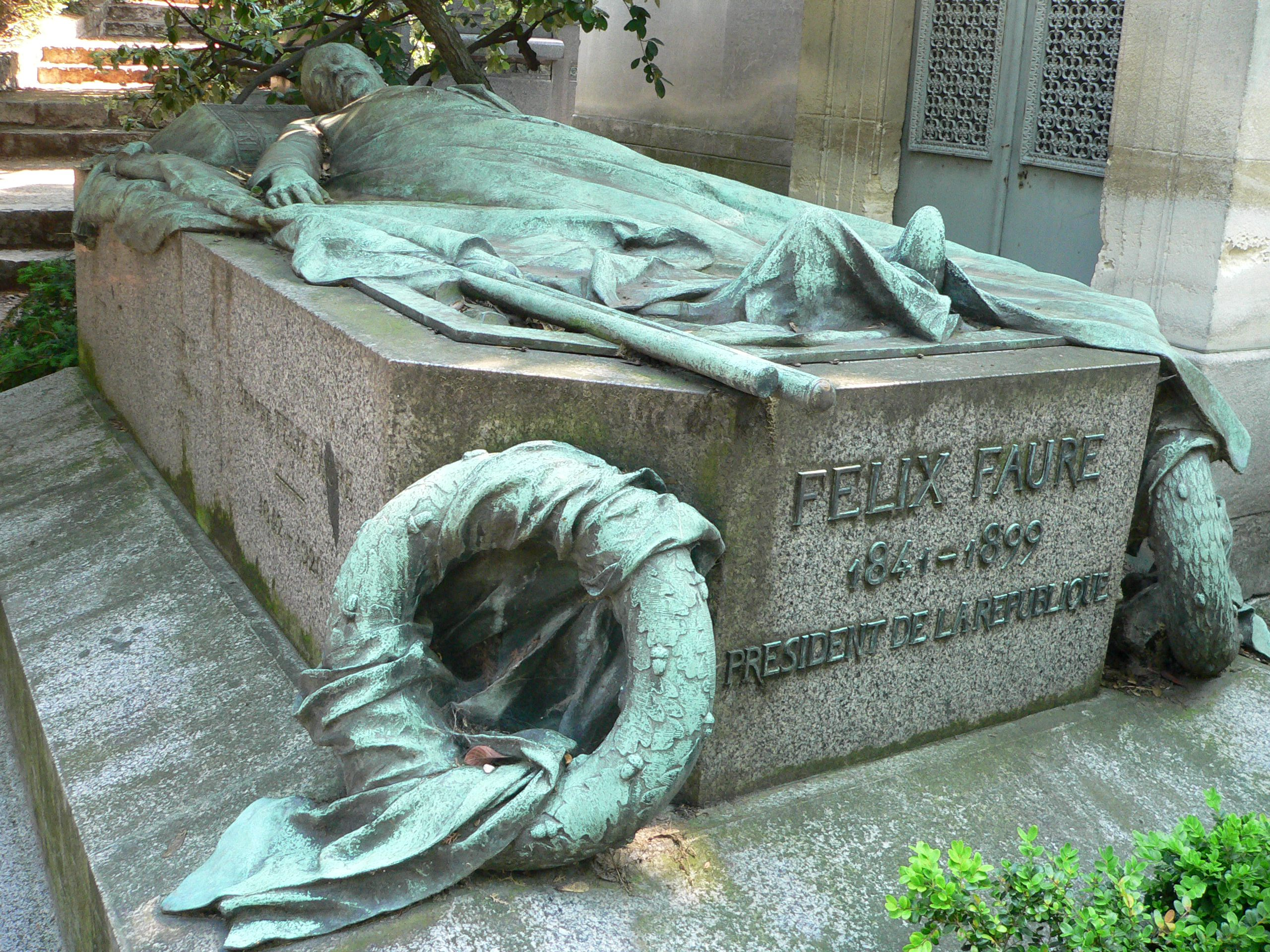
Félix Faure's grave at Père Lachaise Cemetery

In 1898 (and for the first few years of the following century), the French automobile industry was the largest in the world. President Faure was not impressed. Invited to address industry leaders at what, in retrospect, is recorded as the first Paris Motor Show, Faure told his audience, "Your cars are very ugly and they smell very bad" ("Vos voitures sont bien laides et sentent bien mauvais !").

His fine presence and his tact on ceremonial occasions rendered the state some service when he received the Tsar at Paris in 1896, and in 1897 returned his visit, after which meeting the Franco-Russian Alliance was publicly announced again. The latter days of Faure's presidency were consumed by the Dreyfus affair, which he was determined to regard as chose jugée (Latin: res judicata, "adjudicated with no further appeal"). This drew against him the criticism of pro-Dreyfus intellectuals and politicians, such as Émile Zola and Georges Clemenceau.

== Freemasonry ==
Félix Faure was initiated in Le Havre, at "L'aménité", a lodge of Grand Orient de France, on 25 October 1865.

== Death ==
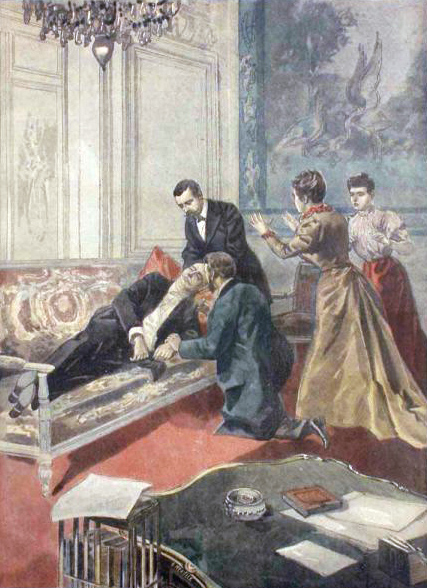
Faure's death, as illustrated by Le Petit Journal.

Faure died suddenly at the age of 58 from a stroke in the Élysée Palace on 16 February 1899.

An American newspaper segment at the time read:

About 6 o'clock M. Faure, who was then in his study went to the door of the room of M. LeGall, his private secretary, which is contiguous to the study, and said:

"I do not feel well. Come to me."

M. LeGall immediately went to the President's aid, led him to a sofa and called General Bailloud. General Secretary of the President's household, M. Blondell, Under Private Secretary, and Dr. Humbert, who happened to be at the Elysee, attending a relative.

The President's condition did not appear dangerous: but Dr. Herbert, on perceiving that he was rapidly getting worse, telephoned for Dr. Lann-Longue and Dr. Cheurlet, who arrived with M. Dupoy and were joined later by Dr. Bergeroy.

Though M. Faure still retained consciousness, the doctors recognized that the case was hopeless, but it was not until nearly 8 o'clock that the family were informed of the real state of affairs. They then came to the sofa where the President lay upon a hastily improvised bed. after he began to lose consciousness and despite all efforts expired at ten, in the presence of the family and M. Dupuy.

Unconfirmed rumours at the time state he was engaged in sexual activities in his office on top of the presidential desk with the 29-year-old Marguerite Steinheil.

It has been widely reported that those activities were oral sex, but their exact nature is in fact unknown and such reports may have stemmed from various jeux de mots (puns) made up afterward by his political opponents. According to the legend, Steinheil was performing oral sex on him when he suffered a fatal stroke, his convulsed hands tangled in her hair. This was not officially announced, but rumours started spreading immediately, although for several years it was believed that his partner at the time of his death was actress Cécile Sorel.

According to Pierre Darmon, a historian of medicine born in 1939, the popular story of Faure's death is a legend: Félix Faure showed signs of tachycardia. A stormy meeting with the Prince Albert of Monaco (a Dreyfusard, who demanded that Germany act as guarantor for the innocent captain) would have aggravated the president's condition. He then spent a few minutes with his mistress before fainting and returning to his office. He would have died surrounded by his family and his doctor. But according to Germain Galérant, doctor and member of the International Society for the History of Medicine, Faure died of a stroke, the first signs of which appeared several hours earlier, and the historian puts the version of the deadly antics on the account of “Mrs. Steinheil’s mythomania”.

== In popular culture ==
The French barque Président Felix Faure, named for the President, was involved in a 1908 case of shipwreck at the Antipodes Islands, south of New Zealand, the survivors being stranded for sixty days before being rescued.

Faure's liaison with Marguerite Steinheil was the subject of the film The President's Mistress (2009) broadcast on Eurochannel, with Cristiana Reali in Steinheil's role, and was referenced in the opening episode of the television series, Paris Police 1900 (2021), with Évelyne Brochu as Steinheil.

== See also ==
- Félix Faure (Paris Métro), a station on line 8 of the Paris Métro
- Si-Mustapha, a town in Algeria formerly named Félix-Faure

== Notes ==
Political offices
Preceded by Auguste Alfred Lefèvre	Minister of the Navy; 1894–1895	Succeeded by Armand Besnard
Preceded by Jean Casimir-Perier	President of France; 1895–1899	Succeeded by Émile Loubet
Regnal titles
Preceded by Jean Casimir-Perier	Co-Prince of Andorra; 1895–1899; Served alongside: Salvador Casañas i Pagés	Succeeded by Émile Loubet
