= Eugène Guérin =

French politician (1849–1929)

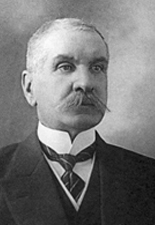

Vice President of the French Senate
- In office 1905–1908

Minister of Justice
- In office 5 April 1893 – 2 December 1893
- Prime Minister: Charles Dupuy
- Preceded by: Léon Bourgeois
- Succeeded by: Antonin Dubost
- In office 30 May 1894 – 17 January 1895
- Prime Minister: Charles Dupuy
- Preceded by: Antonin Dubost
- Succeeded by: Ludovic Trarieux

Member of the French Senate for Vaucluse
- In office 1 June 1890 – 10 January 1920
- Preceded by: Alfred Joseph Naquet
- Succeeded by: Louis Serre

Mayor of Carpentras
- In office October 1881 – December 1886

Personal details
- Born: 27 July 1849 Carpentras, France
- Died: 25 April 1929 (Aged 79) Paris, France
- Party: Radical Party
- Spouse: Césarée Madeleine Marie Thérèse Pascal
- Children: 7
- Education: Faculty of Law of Paris

Eugène Guérin (French pronunciation: [øʒɛn ɡeʁɛ̃]; 27 July 1849 - 25 April 1929) was a French politician who served twice as Minister of Justice and served as a member of the French Senate for Vaucluse for nearly 30 years.

== Early life ==
Guérin was born on 27 July 1849 in Carpentras, France to Pierre Barthélemy Guérin (1808-1868) and Rose Dupuy (1815-1855). He studied in Grenoble before enrolling at the Faculty of Law of Paris. His studies however were interrupted by the Franco-Prussian War of 1870. Guérin temporarily halted his studies and joined the Vaucluse mobiles, seeing action at the Loire and during the Eastern campaigns of the war. Following the end of the war in 1871, Guérin resumed his studies and graduated that same year with a doctorate in law. Guérin was admitted to the bar in Paris and Carpentras in 1875. He married Césarée Madeleine Marie Thérèse Pascal (1859-1936) on 20 October 1880 in Aubagne. The couple went on to have seven children.

== Career ==
Guérin first ran for office in the Carpentras municipal elections in 1875, succeeding in being elected municipal councillor and even becoming deputy mayor. Guérin later served as Mayor of Carpentras from October 1881 to December 1886. Following the resignation of Senator Alfred Joseph Naquet in 1890, the position of Senator for Vaucluse was now up for grabs in the upcoming by-election. Guérin ran for the senate seat and won the election on 1 June 1890, being confirmed as a Senator after winning again in the general election on 4 January 1891.

During his time in the senate, Guérin was promoted to the position of secretary of the Senate from 1892 to 1893. He resigned as secretary following his appointment by Prime Minister Charles Dupuy to be Minister of Justice and Keeper of the Seals in April 1893. He held this position until December 1893, before being reinstated as Justice Minister during the second cabinet of Prime Minister Charles Dupuy in May 1894. It was during Guérin's second mandate that the Dreyfus affair occurred shortly before the end of his term in January 1895

Guérin ran for re-election to the Senate in 1900 and won his bid on 23 January 1900. During this Senate term, Guérin was named Vice President of the Senate from 1905 to 1908. Guérin won re-election again on 3 January 1909, but lost his next re-election bid on 11 January 1920.

== Later life and death ==
Following his election defeat in 1920, Guérin retired from politics. He died in the 16th arrondissement of Paris, France on 25 April 1929, aged 79.
