= Auguste Mercier =

French Minister of War (1833-1921)

Auguste Mercier (8 December 1833 – 3 March 1921) was a French general and Minister of War at the time when the political scandal that became known as the Dreyfus Affair began.

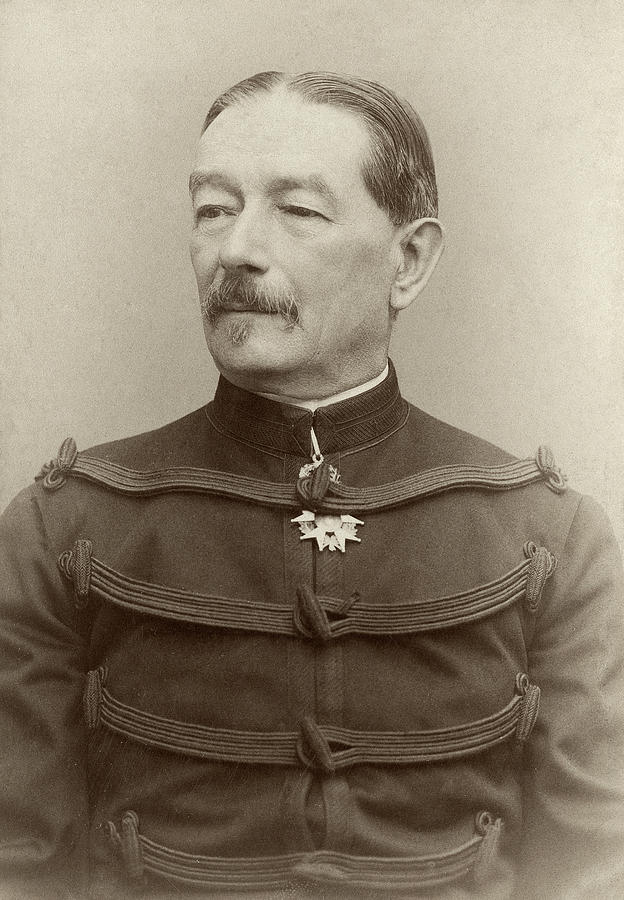
General Auguste Mercier when Minister for War in 1894

== Military career ==
Auguste Mercier was born in Arras. He entered the École Polytechnique at the age of 19 in 1852, and came 4th in a class of 106. He continued for a second period in 1854 and chose to enter the artillery.

Appointed in 1856 as a second lieutenant in the 13th Regiment of Mounted Artillery, then in 1856, he was assigned to the 2nd Regiment of Mounted Artillery. Subsequently, he was assigned to the Regiment of Horse Artillery of the Guard.

Promoted to Lieutenant in 1857, he was appointed captain of the 18th Regiment of Horse Artillery in 1860 until December 1861. Next in 1862 he was posted to the 5th Regiment of Foot Artillery. In Mexico from 1862 to 1864, he was deputy commanding general of the depot. He ran the foundry during the siege of Puebla. He was a recipient of the Medal of Mexico, Knight of the Legion of Honour (1863), Knight of the Order of Guadalupe (1865), Knight of the Order of St. Maurice and St. Lazarus (It) (1865). He received the Order of Charles III in 1869, having accompanied a Spanish general during the Universal Exhibition of 1867.

== Franco-Prussian War ==
In the countryside around Metz he was briefly a prisoner of war. He then commanded the 16th Battery of the 6th Artillery Regiment in the town. He fought in Neuilly, Courbevoie, and Asnieres. He distinguished himself in the capture of the fort of Issy (Officer of the Legion of Honour) and was present during operations in Paris from 22 May to 1 June 1871.

- Member of the Feedback Committee of Calais
- 1872 Promoted to Cavalry Major
- 1872 Posted to the 27th Artillery Regiment
- 1873 Posted to the 18th Artillery Regiment
- 1874 Directed the Pyrotechnic Military School to 1880
- 1876 Promoted to Lieutenant Colonel in 1876
- 1879 Promoted to colonel
- 1880 Commanded the 2nd Artillery Regiment to 1884
- 1884 Promoted to brigadier general in 1884
- 1885 Director of Administrative Services at the Ministry of War to 1886
- 1886 Appointed artillery commander of the 12th Army Corps to 1888
- 1888 Director of administrative services at the Ministry of War to 1889
- 1889 Promoted to major general in 1889
- 1890 Appointed head of the Third Infantry Division
- 1890 Promoted to commander of the Legion of Honour
- 1893 Appointed head of the 18th Army Corps
- 1893 Appointed minister of war to 1895
- 1894 Awarded Grand Officer of Nicham Iftikar
- 1894 Awarded Commander of the Order of the Rising Sun
- 1894 Awarded Commander 2nd class of Dannebrog
- 1895 Promoted to Grand Officer of the Legion of Honour
- 1895 Head of the 4th Army Corps to 1898
- 1898 Member of the Supreme Council of War
- 1898 Reserve
- Member of the technical committee of artillery, the Powder and Saltpetre Committee, and the Joint Committee of Public Works

== Political career ==
Mercier was responsible for the War portfolio in December 1893 in the cabinet of Casimir-Perier. He succeeded Julien Loizillon, who had replaced Charles de Freycinet at the beginning of 1893. His reputation was that of an intelligent and thoughtful officer, who had Republican sympathies. He was a Catholic, although he married an English Protestant who did not go to Mass, but was open to liberal ideas. He was polite, very talkative, very energetic, and had an amazing memory.

He retained his position in May 1894 in the Cabinet of Dupuy, which probably gave him the notion of being indispensable:

"He cut short everyone, dry, haughty, a provocative self-conceit, infallible and sure of his destiny."

In August 1894, Mercier conditionally released a person which earned him a campaign from the right-wing press who accused him of covering up for "Jews and spies."

In January 1900, Mercier was elected as a nationalist senator for Lower Loire, a seat he held until 1920.

== Mercier in the Dreyfus Affair ==
In the summer of 1894, Mercier was advised that the "Statistical Section" had intercepted what would become the "bordereau". He understood that "if the offender is found, arrested, and convicted, it will be politically profitable." In addition, it would "muzzle the far right and the press". He then ordered an internal investigation.

From 7 October 1894, convinced who was the guilty party solely on the basis of the dubious expertise in handwriting of Alphonse Bertillon, Mercier decided on the guilt of Dreyfus. He subsequently never varied in his opinion. He would be for Alfred Dreyfus, the "Chief Criminal."

During the Dreyfus trial, the Military Court required the disclosure of a secret file. As soon as Dreyfus was convicted by the Military Court, he filed a bill to reinstate the death penalty for the crime of treason. In February 1895, Mercier was replaced at the Ministry of War by Émile Zurlinden, after having demanded the destruction of the Dreyfus secret file. He was then appointed commander of the 4th Region and passed into the reserve in 1898.

In J'accuse ...!, Émile Zola did not understand the importance of Mercier's role and accused him simply of "aiding and abetting, at least through weakness of mind, one of the largest iniquities of the century." Summonsed in the Zola trial in February, "haughty, impassive, precise, disdainfully entrenched in the consciousness of his own infallibility, he declared that Dreyfus was a traitor who had been justly and lawfully convicted" and refused to answer on the existence of secret documents.

Questioned in November 1898 by the Criminal Chamber of the Supreme Court, in the context of the proceedings for review of the 1894 trial, Mercier reaffirmed the guilt of Dreyfus. He declared in this regard that the Criminal Division was bought by the dreyfusard "Syndicate". In June 1899, on the judgment of the Supreme Court, Mercier was the subject of an accusation by the House (228 votes against 277) but he did not give up: "I am not an accused, I remain an accuser".

At the Rennes trial, he presented himself as leader of the anti-dreyfusards. He announced that there would be decisive revelations to come in the nationalist press, as the existence of an original copy of the bordereau annotated by the Kaiser (Wilhelm II of Germany). His testimony before the Military Court brought no new revelations, and he declared:

My conviction since 1894 has not suffered the slightest damage, rather it is deepened by a more comprehensive study of the case, it is finally strengthened by the failure of the results obtained [from the Military Court] to demonstrate the innocence of the convicted, despite the huge number of millions spent foolishly…

At the end of 1899, an amnesty law was passed by Parliament, against the fierce opposition of Georges Clemenceau and Jean Jaurès. "The first of the criminals" was now immune from prosecution.

In March 1904, before the Criminal Chamber of the Supreme Court, Mercier again accused Dreyfus. On the eve of the judgment without reference by the Supreme Court, he was unable to provide any "irrefutable" evidence despite the pleas of the anti-Semitic press and the nationalists.

On 13 July 1906, in the Senate, he voted against the reinstatement of Dreyfus and Colonel Georges Picquart to the army. He also accused the Supreme Court of irregularities. On 29 June 1907, before 6000 people at the Salle Wagram, French Action gave him a gold medal in memory of the session in which he had "stood up to the parliamentary madness."

Mercier died in Paris on 3 March 1921 aged 87. Until his last breath, from the depths of his soul, he would never cease to proclaim the guilt of Dreyfus.

== Successive military ranks ==
- 1856 : Second Lieutenant
- 1856 : Lieutenant
- 1857 : First Lieutenant
- 1860 : Captain
- 1865 : First Captain
- 1876 : Lieutenant Colonel
- 1879 : Colonel
- 1884 : Brigadier General
- 1889 : Major General

== Decorations ==
- 1863 Commemorative medal of the Mexico Expedition
- 1863 Knight of the Legion of Honour
- 1865 Knight of the Order of Our Lady of Guadalupe (Mexico)
- 1865 Knight of the Order of St. Maurice and St. Lazarus (Italy)
- 1869 Order of Charles III (Spain)
- 1871 Officer of the Legion of Honour
- 1890 Commander of the Legion of Honour
- 1894 Grand Officer Nicham Iftikar (Tunisia)
- 1894 Commander of the Order of the Rising Sun (Japan)
- 1894 Commander 2nd class of the Order of Dannebrog (Denmark)
- 1895 Grand Officer of the Legion of Honour

=== Notes ===
Political offices
Preceded by Julien Léon Loizillon	Minister of War; 3 December 1893-24 January 1895	Succeeded by Émile Zurlinden
