= French maneuvers of 1901 =

The French maneuvers of 1901 were autumn maneuvers of the French Navy and French Army, beginning with naval maneuvers at Dunkirk on 18 September, and ending with a military review at Reims on 21 September. They were attended by emperor Nicholas II of Russia and his wife Alexandra Feodorovna upon the invitation of French president Émile Loubet. The imperial guests arrived at Dunkirk on the Standart on 18 September from Danzig, where Nicholas II had met with German emperor Wilhelm II.

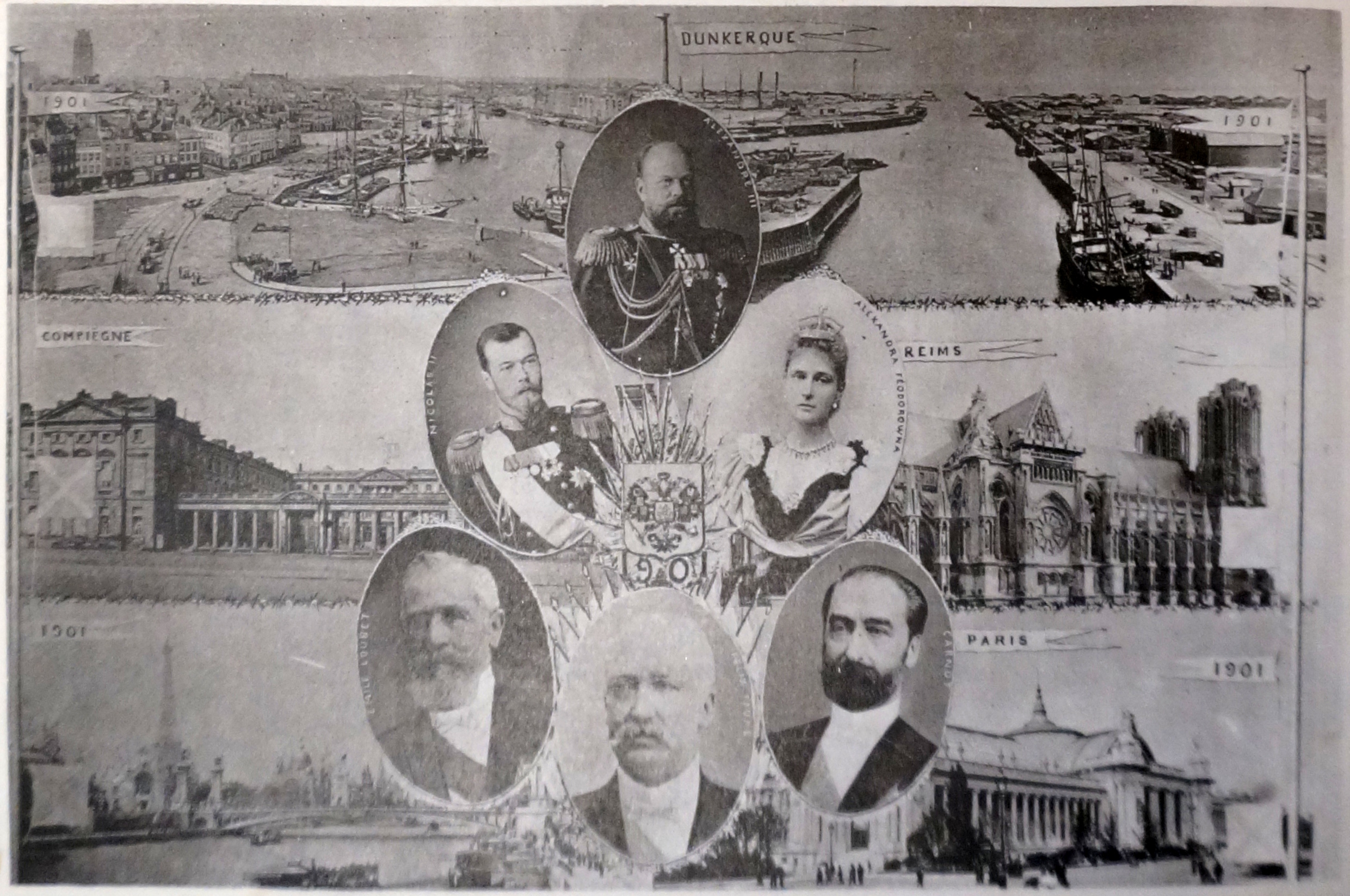
Souvenir postcard of the maneuvers

According to Charles Oman,

The whole business was designed so much as a military demonstration that the Czar did not even pass through Paris or display himself there, but went straight from Dunkirk to Reims, avoiding the capital, and making the old royal and imperial palace of Compiegne his main halting-place.

As explained by S. S. Oldenburg,

The tone of Franco-Russian relations was changed somewhat under the new (radical) regime: Nicholas expressed no desire to visit Paris, and the French government did not press him. Revue des deux Mondes observed that "this second visit of the Russian tsarist couple admittedly did not inspire the same broad popular enthusiasm as the first."
