= Jean Casimir-Perier =

President of France from 1894 to 1895

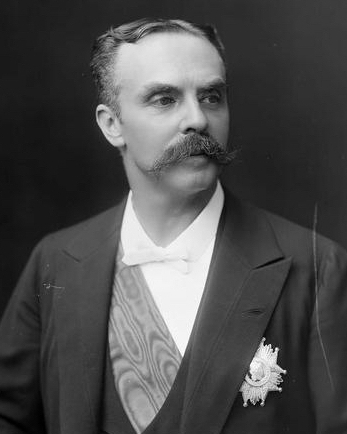
- Photograph by Nadar, 1894

President of France
- In office 27 June 1894 – 16 January 1895
- Prime Minister: Charles Dupuy
- Preceded by: Sadi Carnot
- Succeeded by: Félix Faure

Prime Minister of France
- In office 3 December 1893 – 30 May 1894
- President: Sadi Carnot
- Preceded by: Charles Dupuy
- Succeeded by: Charles Dupuy

Personal details
- Born: 8 November 1847 Paris, France
- Died: 11 March 1907 (aged 59) Paris, France
- Party: Moderate Republicans
- Spouse: Hélène Casimir-Perier
- Education: University of Paris

Jean Paul Pierre Casimir-Perier (French: [ʒɑ̃ kazimiʁ peʁje]; 8 November 1847 – 11 March 1907) was a French politician who served as President of France from June 1894 to January 1895.

== Biography ==
Jean Casimir-Perier was born in Paris on 8 November 1847, the son of Auguste Casimir-Perier, the grandson of Casimir Pierre Perier, premier of Louis Philippe, and the great-grandson of Claude Périer, one of the founders of the Bank of France. He entered public life as secretary to his father, who was Minister of the Interior under the presidency of Thiers.

In 1874 he was elected General Councillor of the Aube département, and was sent by the same département to the Chamber of Deputies in the general elections of 1876, and he was always re-elected until his presidency. In spite of the traditions of his family, Casimir-Perier joined the group of Republicans on the Left, and was one of the 363 on the Seize-Mai (1877). He refused to vote the "expulsion of the Princes" in 1883, and resigned as Deputy upon the enactment of the law (26 June 1886) because of his personal connections with the family of Orléans.

On 17 August 1883 he became Under-Secretary of State for War, a post he retained until 7 January 1885. From 1890 to 1892 he was Vice President of the Chamber, then in 1893 President. On 3 December he became President of the council, holding the department of Foreign Affairs, resigned in May 1894, and was re-elected President of the Chamber. During his premiership, a decree on health and safety was issued in March 1894.

On 24 June 1894, after the assassination of President Carnot, he was elected President of the Republic by 451 votes against 195 for Henri Brisson and 97 for Charles Dupuy. His presidency lasted only six months. The resignation of the Dupuy ministry on 14 January 1895 was followed the next day by that of the President. Casimir-Perier explained his action by the fact that he found himself ignored by the ministers, who did not consult him before taking decisions, and did not keep him informed upon political events, especially in foreign affairs.

From that time he completely abandoned politics, and devoted himself to business – especially mining. At the trial of Alfred Dreyfus at Rennes, Casimir-Perier's evidence, as opposed to that of General Mercier, was of great value to the cause of Dreyfus.

Casimir-Perier died on 11 March 1907 in Paris of angina pectoris.

As of 2024, of all Presidents of France through its history, Casimir-Perier had the shortest presidency.

== Casimir-Perier's Ministry, 3 December 1893 – 30 May 1894 ==
- Jean Casimir-Perier – President of the Council and Minister of Foreign Affairs
- Auguste Mercier – Minister of War
- David Raynal – Minister of the Interior
- Auguste Burdeau – Minister of Finance
- Antonin Dubost – Minister of Justice
- Jean Marty – Minister of Commerce, Industry, and Colonies
- Auguste Alfred Lefèvre – Minister of Marine
- Eugène Spuller – Minister of Public Instruction, Fine Arts, and Worship
- Albert Viger – Minister of Agriculture
- Charles Jonnart – Minister of Public Works

Changes

- 20 March 1894 – Jean Marty becomes Minister of Posts and Telegraphs as well as Minister of Commerce and Industry. Ernest Boulanger succeeds Marty as Minister of Colonies.

Political offices
Preceded by Charles Floquet	President of the Chamber of Deputies; 1893	Succeeded by Charles Dupuy
Preceded by Charles Dupuy	Prime Minister of France; 1893–1894	Succeeded by Charles Dupuy
Preceded by Jules Develle	Minister of Foreign Affairs; 1893–1894	Succeeded by Marcellin Berthelot
Preceded by Charles Dupuy	President of the Chamber of Deputies; 1894	Succeeded by Auguste Burdeau
Preceded by Sadi Carnot	President of France; 1894–1895	Succeeded by Félix Faure
Regnal titles
Preceded by Sadi Carnot	Co-Prince of Andorra; 1894–1895; Served alongside: Salvador Casañas y Pagés	Succeeded by Félix Faure
