= Albert Viger =

French politician (1843–1926)

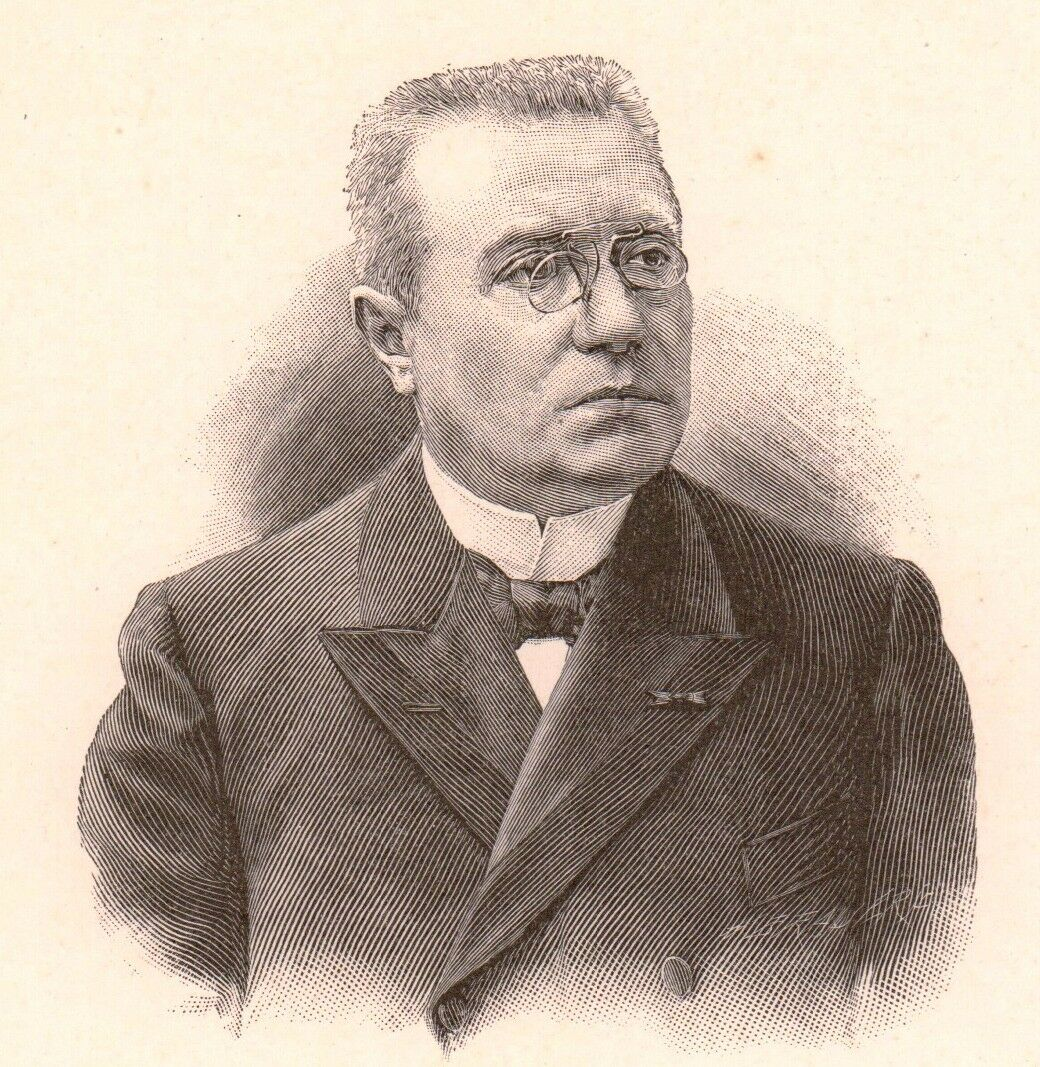
French politician Albert Viger (1843-1926)

Albert Viger (19 October 1843 – 8 July 1926) was a French politician of the Third French Republic. He served three times as minister of agriculture in the governments of Alexandre Ribot, Charles Dupuy, Jean Casimir-Perier, Léon Bourgeois and Henri Brisson. He served in the Senate of France and was a member of the Legion of Honour.

Preceded by Jules Develle	Minister of Agriculture of France; 11 January 1893 – 26 January 1895	Succeeded by Antoine Gadaud
Preceded by Antoine Gadaud	Minister of Agriculture of France; 1 November 1895 – 29 April 1896	Succeeded by Jules Méline
Preceded by Jules Méline	Minister of Agriculture of France; 28 June 1898 – 22 June 1899	Succeeded by Jean Dupuy

== Sources ==
- "Albert Viger", in Adolphe Robert and Gaston Cougny, Dictionnaire des parlementaires français (1789–1891), Bourloton, Paris, 1889 Edition details Wikisource
