= Antonin Dubost =

French journalist, State Councillor and Senator

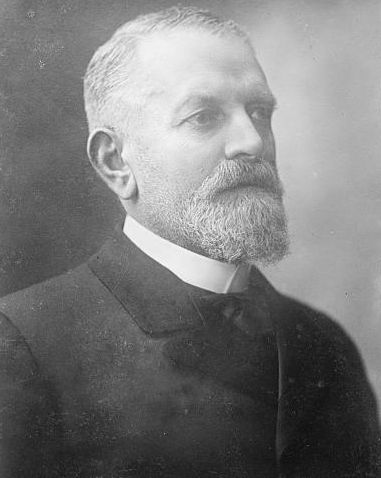
Antonin Dubost in 1910.

Antonin Dubost (6 April 1842 – 16 April 1921) was a French journalist, State Councillor and Senator. He served as President of the French Senate from 1906 to 1920. He was a member of the Republican Union and later an Independent Radical.

Dubost was born at L'Arbresle, Rhône. He was a candidate for President of the French Republic in 1913. As President of the Senate during all of the first World War, he was a strong advocate of forcing Germany to make reparations.

He co-authored a book on the history of legal enforcement, studying the use of imprisonment and deportation. He died in Paris, aged 79.

== Political career ==
In the government of Jean Casimir-Perier, Dubost served as Minister of Justice between 1893 and 1894. He served as Senator for Isère from 1897 to 1921. In January 1906, Armand Fallières stood down as President of the French Senate and Dubost was elected in his place. Fallières went on to become the President of the French Republic. He was serving as a Senator at the time of his death.

He was involved in French politics from the foundation of the French Republic in 1870. He was a Counselor of State, he served as a member of the Chamber of Deputies for seventeen years and as a Senator for twenty-four years.

== See also ==
- List of presidents of the Senate of France

Preceded by Eugène Guérin	Lord Chancellor of France; 1893–1894	Succeeded by Eugène Guérin
Preceded by Armand Fallières	President of the French Senate; 1906–1920	Succeeded by Léon Bourgeois
