= Marsanne, Drôme =

Marsanne
- Commune
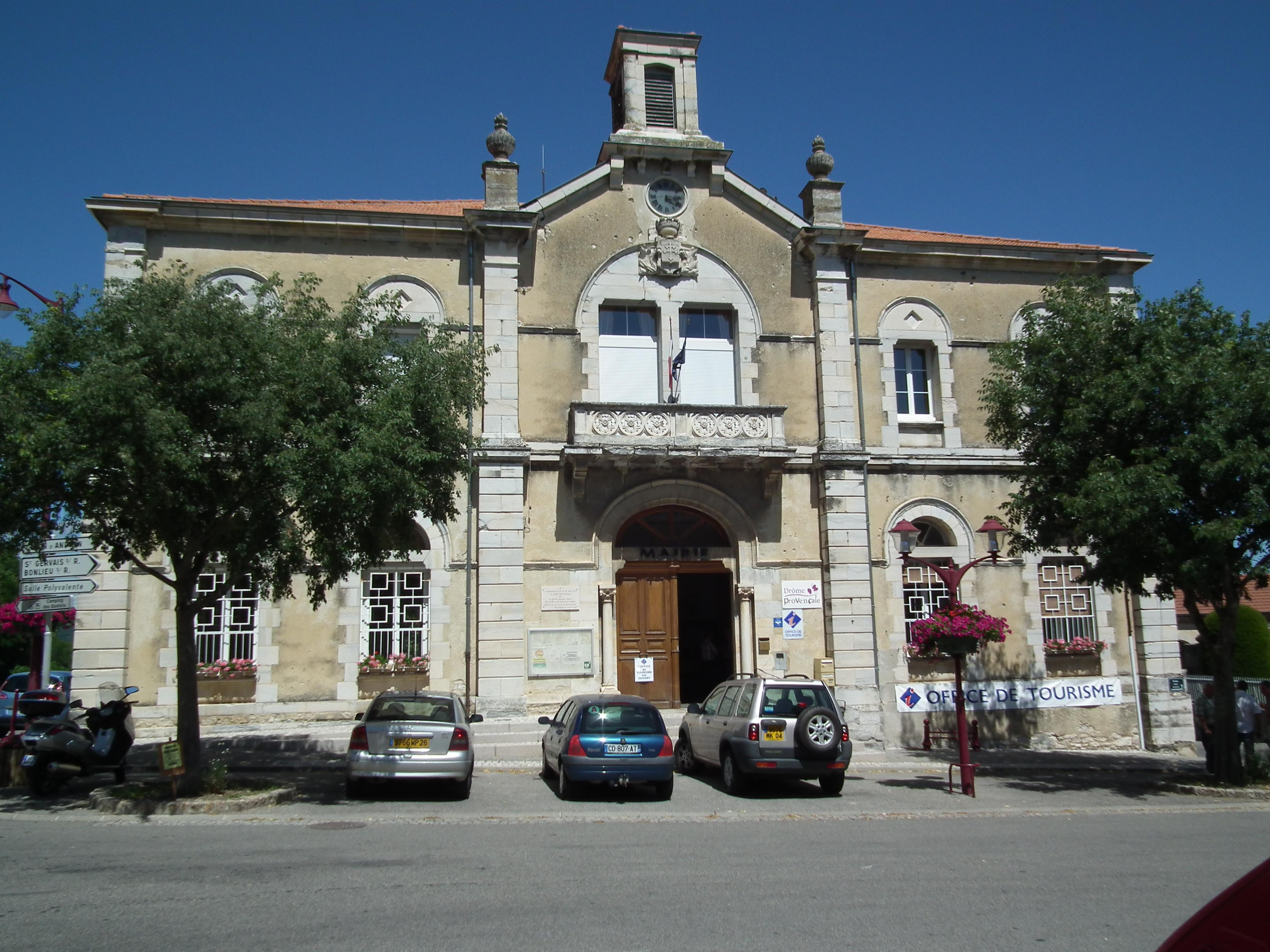
- Town hall

- Coat of arms
- Location of Marsanne
- Location within France Location within Auvergne-Rhône-Alpes
- Coordinates: 44°38′40″N 4°52′25″E
- Country: France
- Region: Auvergne-Rhône-Alpes
- Department: Drôme
- Arrondissement: Nyons
- Canton: Dieulefit
- Intercommunality: Montélimar Agglomération

Government
  - Mayor (2020–2026): Damien Lagier
- Area^{1}: 34.29 km^{2} (13.24 sq mi)
- Elevation: 309 m (1,014 ft)
- Highest elevation: 586 m (1,923 ft)
- Lowest elevation: 140 m (460 ft)
- Population (2023): 1,246
  - Density: 36.34/km^{2} (94.11/sq mi)
- Time zone: UTC+01:00 (CET)
  - Summer (DST): UTC+02:00 (CEST)
- INSEE/Postal code: 26176 /26740
- ^{1} French Land Register data, which excludes lakes, ponds, glaciers > 1 km^{2} (0.386 sq mi or 247 acres) and river estuaries.

Marsanne (French pronunciation: [maʁsan]; Vivaro-Alpine: Marçana) is a commune in the Drôme department in southeastern France.

== Population ==
Historical population
Year	Pop.	±% p.a.
1968	817	—
1975	779	−0.68%
1982	772	−0.13%
1990	873	+1.55%
1999	998	+1.50%
2007	1,227	+2.62%
2012	1,205	−0.36%
2017	1,343	+2.19%
2023	1,246	−1.24%
Source: INSEE

== Personalities ==
It was the birthplace of Émile Loubet (1838–1929), 7th president of the French republic.

== See also ==
- Communes of the Drôme department
