= Julien Léon Loizillon =

French general (1829–1899)

Julien Loizillon (15 January 1829, in Paris – 3 May 1899, at Dammarie-lès-Lys), was a French general and politician.

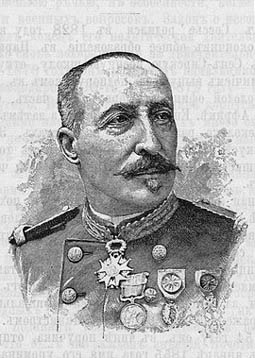

He was Minister of War from January 11, 1893 to April 3, 1893 in the government of Alexandre Ribot and from April 4, 1893 to December 3, 1893 in the government of Charles Dupuy.

Political offices
Preceded by Charles de Freycinet	Minister of War; 11 January 1893 – 3 December 1893	Succeeded by Auguste Mercier
