= Georges Lebret =

French politician (1853–1927)

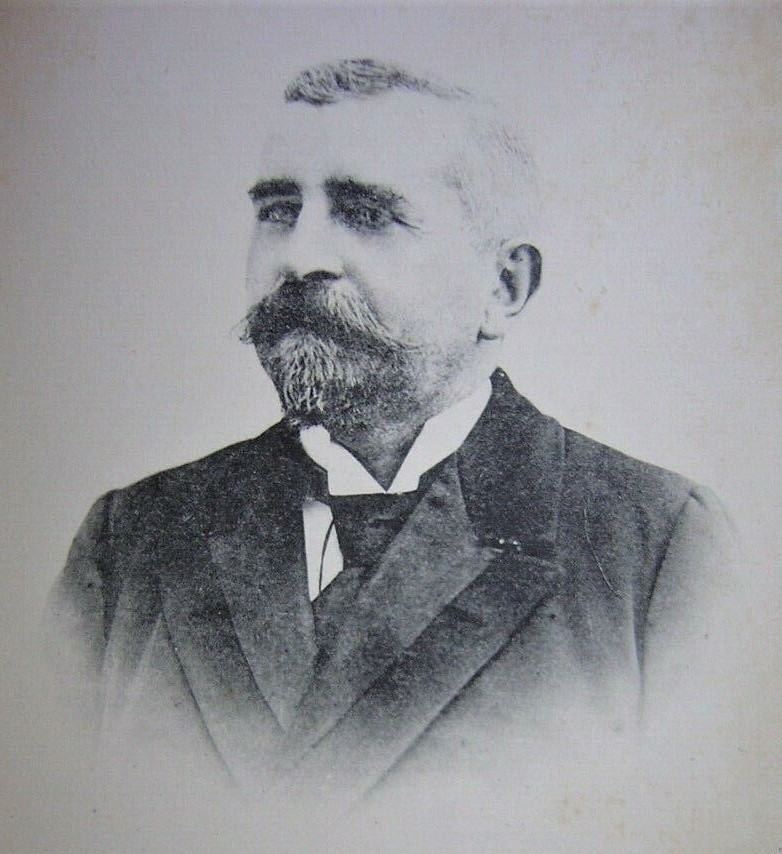

Georges Lebret (French: [ʒɔʁʒ ləbʁɛ]; 7 November 1853 – 16 January 1927) was a French lawyer and politician. He was Minister of Justice from 1898 to 1899.
