= Paul Peytral =

French politician (1842–1919)

Paul Louis Peytral
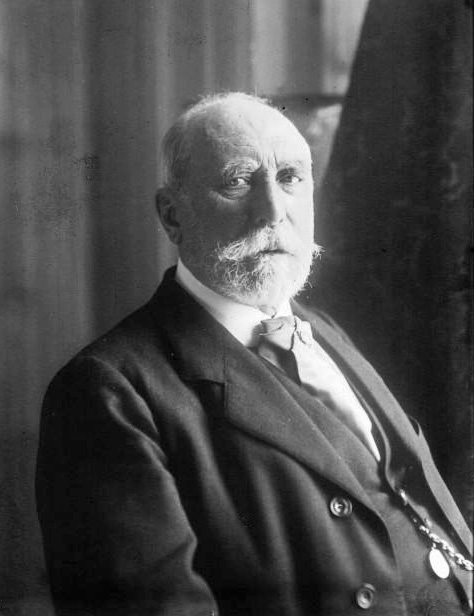
- Paul Peytral in 1914

Personal details
- Born: 20 January 1842 Marseille, Bouches-du-Rhône, France
- Died: 30 November 1919 (aged 77) Marseille, Bouches-du-Rhône, France
- Occupation: Politician

Paul Peytral (20 January 1842 – 30 November 1919) was a French politician of the French Third Republic.

== Career ==
Paul Louis Peytral was born on 20 January 1842 in Marseille, Bouches-du-Rhône. He was elected deputy for Bouches-du-Rhône on 4 September 1881 on the Radical Republican platform, and was reelected on 18 October 1885, 22 September 1889 and 20 October 1893 on the same platform. Paul Peytral was Minister of Finance from 3 April 1888 to 22 February 1889 in the government of Charles Floquet. Charles François Laurent was named chief of staff to Peytral in 1888. Peytral was Minister of Finance from 4 April to 3 December 1893 in the government of Charles Dupuy.

Peytral was a deputy until 15 January 1894, then served in the Senate of France from 1894 until his death. He was Minister of Finance from 26 June 1898 to 22 June 1899 in the government of Henri Brisson. Paul Peytral was interior minister from 9–13 June 1914 in the government of Alexandre Ribot. Paul Peytral died on 30 November 1919 in Marseille.

== Sources ==
- Colling, Alfred (1949), Société d'éditions économiques et financières (ed.), La Prodigieuse histoire de la Bourse, Paris
- Fraboulet, Danièle (2007), Quand les patrons s'organisent: Stratégies et pratiques de l'UIMM 1901-1950 (in French), Presses Univ. Septentrion, ISBN 978-2-85939-994-8
- Paul, Louis Peytral (in French), Assemblée nationale
