= Élisabeth-Antoinette-Catherine Armand =

French artist (1756–1814)

Élisabeth-Antoinette-Catherine de Saulces de Freycinet (née Armand; 17 August 1755 – 22 September 1841) was a French pastellist.

Born in Crest, Drôme, Armand was the daughter of Claude Armand. As a child, she evinced great talent as a producer of pastels, drawing a number of members of her family, as well as a self-portrait, when she was fifteen years old; today several of these may be seen in the musée de Valence.

In 1776, she married the Montélimar merchant Pierre-Louis de Saulces de Freycinet (1751–1827), whose family included among its members two explorers, Louis and Louis Henri de Saulces de Freycinet, and a member of the Académie française, Charles de Freycinet his grandson. It is unknown whether or not she continued her artistic activities after this point. She died in Montélimar in 1841, aged 86.
