= Auguste Alfred Lefèvre =

French vice admiral, aide de camp and politician

Auguste Lefèvre (20 December 1828 in Brest – 6 January 1907 in Paris) was a French vice admiral, aide de camp and politician. He was French Naval Minister from 3 December 1893 to 29 May 1894 in the ministries of Jean Casimir-Perier and Charles Dupuy.

== Sources ==
- Jean-Philippe Zanco, Dictionnaire des Ministres de la Marine 1689-1958, S.P.M. Kronos, Paris 2011.
