= Jules Viette =

French politician

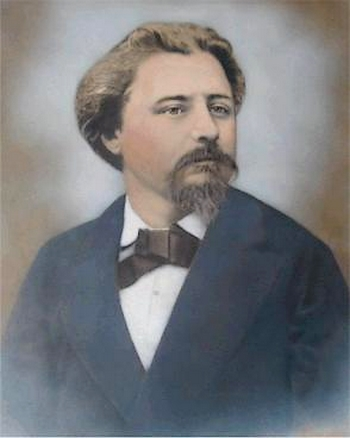

Jules François Stanislas Viette (French: [ʒyl fʁɑ̃swa stanislas vjɛt]; 6 May 1843 – 15 February 1894) was a French journalist and politician. He was Minister of Agriculture from 1887 to 1889 and Minister of Public Works from 1892 to 1893.
