= Jules Roche =

French politician

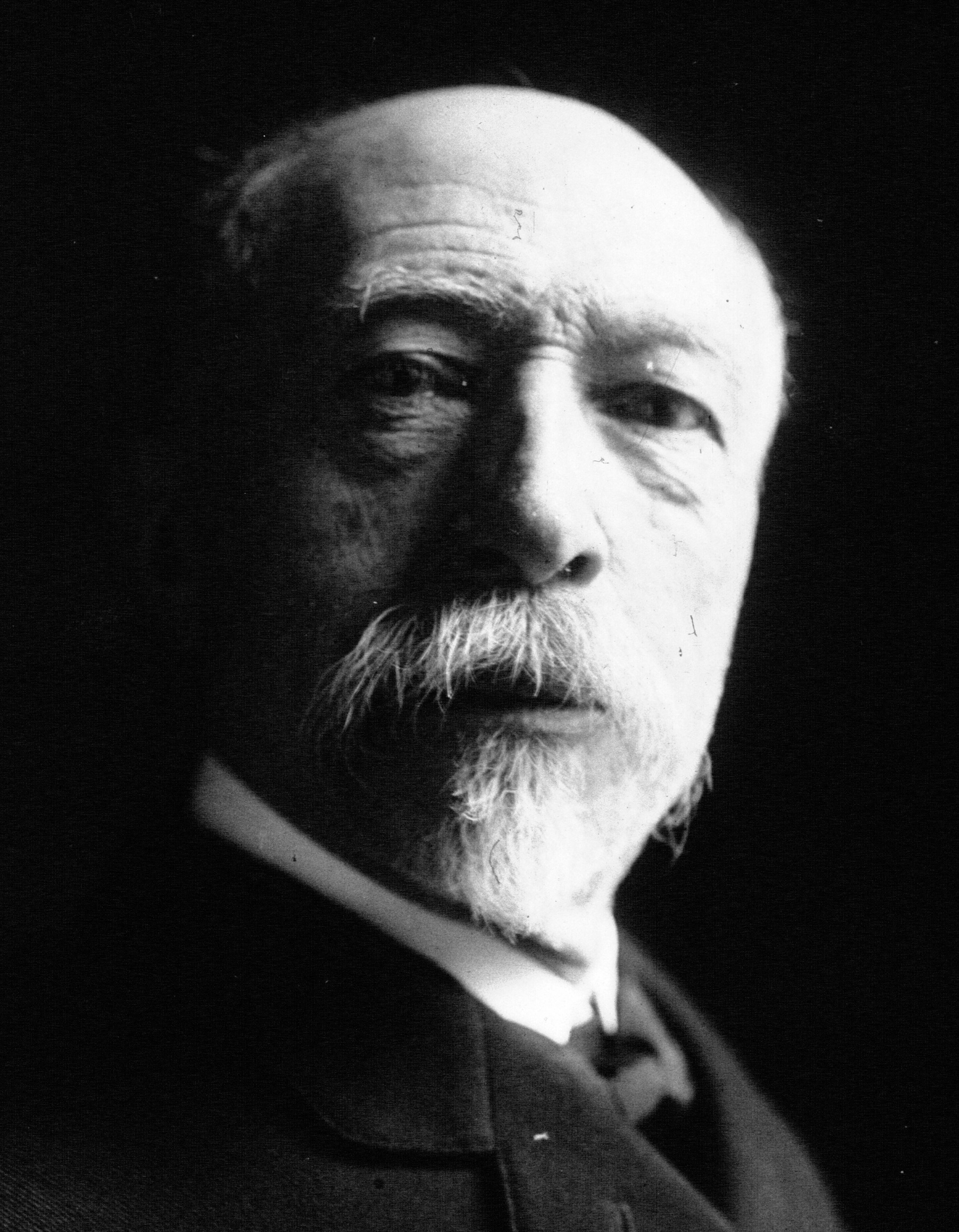
- Born: 22 May 1841; Saint-Étienne, France
- Died: 8 April 1923 (aged 81)
- Occupation: Politician

Jules Roche (22 May 1841, Saint-Étienne - 8 April 1923) was a French politician. He was a member of the Chamber of Deputies from 1881 to 1919. He was Minister of Commerce and Industry from 1890 to 1892. Originally a member of the Republican Union, later on he joined the Republican Federation. On 3 July 1905 he voted against the Law on the Separation of the Churches and the State.

== Principal positions ==
- Mayor of Serrières
- Député du Var, 1881 – 1885
- Député de la Savoie, 1885 – 1898
- Député de l'Ardèche, 1898 – 1919
- Minister of Commerce, de l’Industrie et des Colonies, 17 March 1890 – 8 March 1892
- Minister of Commerce et de l’Industrie, 8 March 1892 – 6 December 1892

== Publications ==
- Le Budget des Cultes (1883)
- L’Allemagne et la France (1898)
- La politique économique de la France (1898)
- Finances et politique (1899)
- Budgets du XIXe siècle et Questions diverses (1901)
- L’Impôt sur le Revenu, Discours Parlementaires, Quand serons-nous en République ? (1918)
- L’Alsace-Lorraine, terre française. (1918)
