= Camille Krantz =

French politician

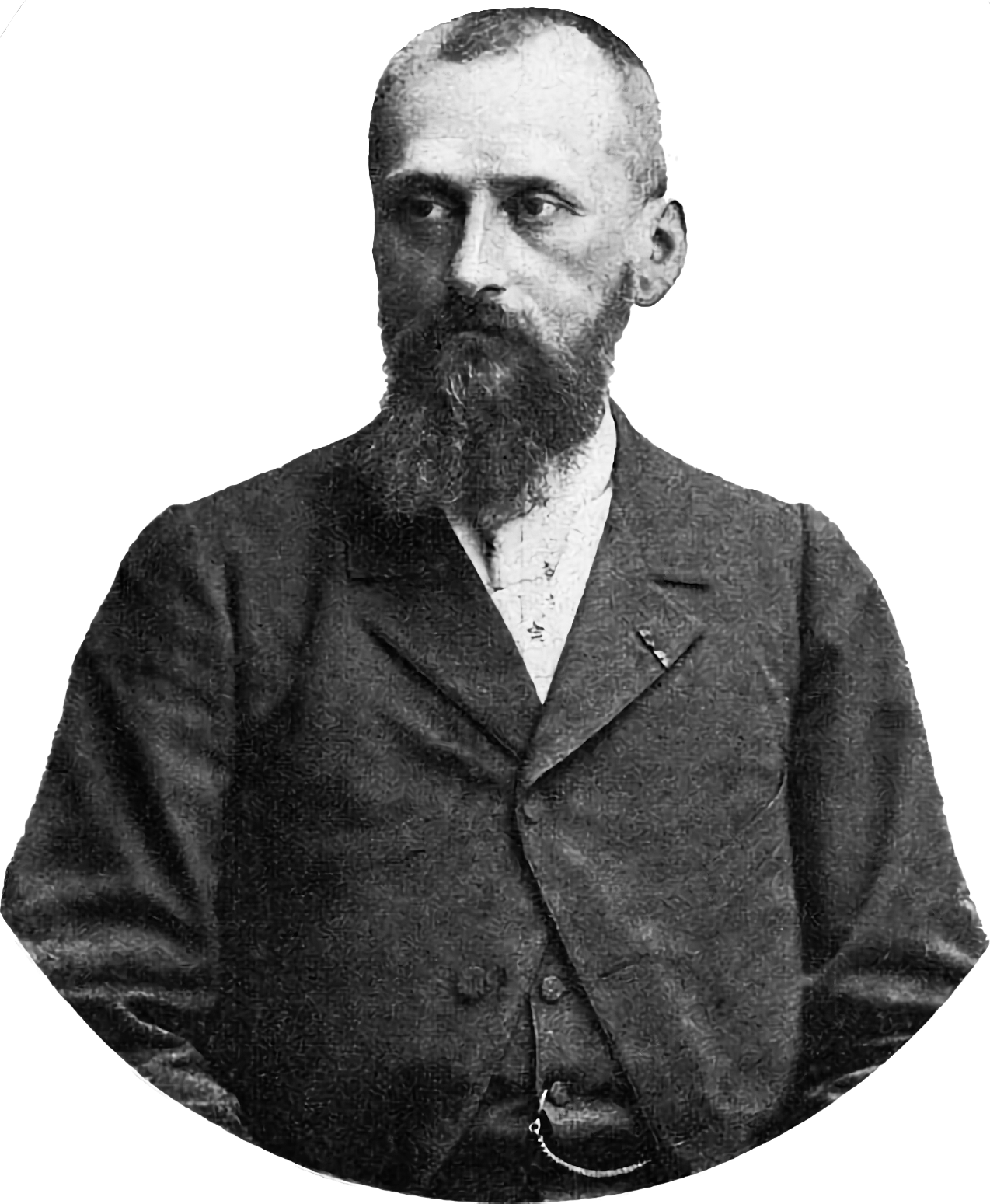
Camille Krantz

Camille Krantz (24 August 1848 – 30 April 1924) was a French politician. He was Minister of Public Works from 1898 to 1899 and Minister of War from May to June 1899.

His tenure at the Ministry of War coincided with the peak of the Dreyfus affair, and was considered an anti-Dreyfusard.

He was a cousin of Jules François Émile Krantz.
