= Jules Develle =

French politician (1845–1919)

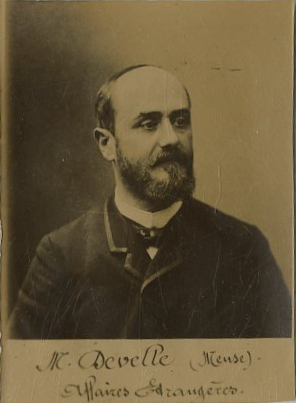

Jules Develle (French pronunciation: [ʒyl dəvɛl]; 12 April 1845 – 30 October 1919) was a French politician.

== Biography ==
He was born in Bar-le-Duc to Claude Charles Develle, an insurance agent, and Anne Marguerite Rousselot. He studied law and became a lawyer. He discovered his passion for political activity as a secretary of Jules Grévy. He was then appointed prefect but he was removed later on because of his political thoughts (1877). He held 13 cabinet posts during the Third Republic including Minister of Justice, Minister of Agriculture and Minister of Foreign Affairs in 1893. increasing the influence of France in Indochina, and also participating in the end of the alliance between France and Russia.

Later, once more a simple deputy, he opposed socialism and income tax. In 1898 he lost an election to the antisemitic nationalist Henry Ferrette, victim of the fallout of the Dreyfus affair, and another in 1899, even more soundly, to another anti-Dreyfus candidate in Louviers.

He died in Paris in 1919.

== Bibliography ==
- La carrière politique des frères Develle (The Political Career of the Develle Brothers), Bulletin des sociétés d'histoire et d'archéologie de la Meuse, (ISSN 0525-1249), n°14 (1977)
- Jules Develle, in Adolphe Robert and Gaston Cougny, Dictionnaire des parlementaires français, Edgar Bourloton, 1889-1891
- Jules Develle, Dictionnaire des parlementaires français (1889-1940), Jean Jolly, ed, 1960
- Jean El Gammal, François Roth and Jean-Claude Delbreil, Dictionnaire des Parlementaires lorrains de la Troisième République, Metz, Serpenoise, 2006 (ISBN 2-87692-620-2, OCLC 85885906, p. 210
- Marcela Hennlichova, Quai d’Orsay Led by an Amateur? Revealing the Unknown – Jules Develle. The International History Review, 2024, 1–15. https://doi.org/10.1080/07075332.2024.2393644
- Marcela Hennlichova, Jules Develle and the Paknam Incident of 1893. Archiv orientální 2023, 91/1, 113-141. https://doi.org/10.47979/aror.j.91.1.113-141

Political offices
Preceded by Pierre Gomot	Minister of Agriculture; 1886–1887	Succeeded by François Barbé
Preceded by Léopold Faye	Minister of Agriculture; 1890–1893	Succeeded by Albert Viger
Preceded by Léon Bourgeois	Minister of Justice; 1893	Succeeded by Léon Bourgeois
Preceded by Alexandre Ribot	Minister of Foreign Affairs; 1893	Succeeded by Jean Casimir-Perier
