= Jean Antoine Ernest Constans =

French politician and colonial administrator (1833–1913)

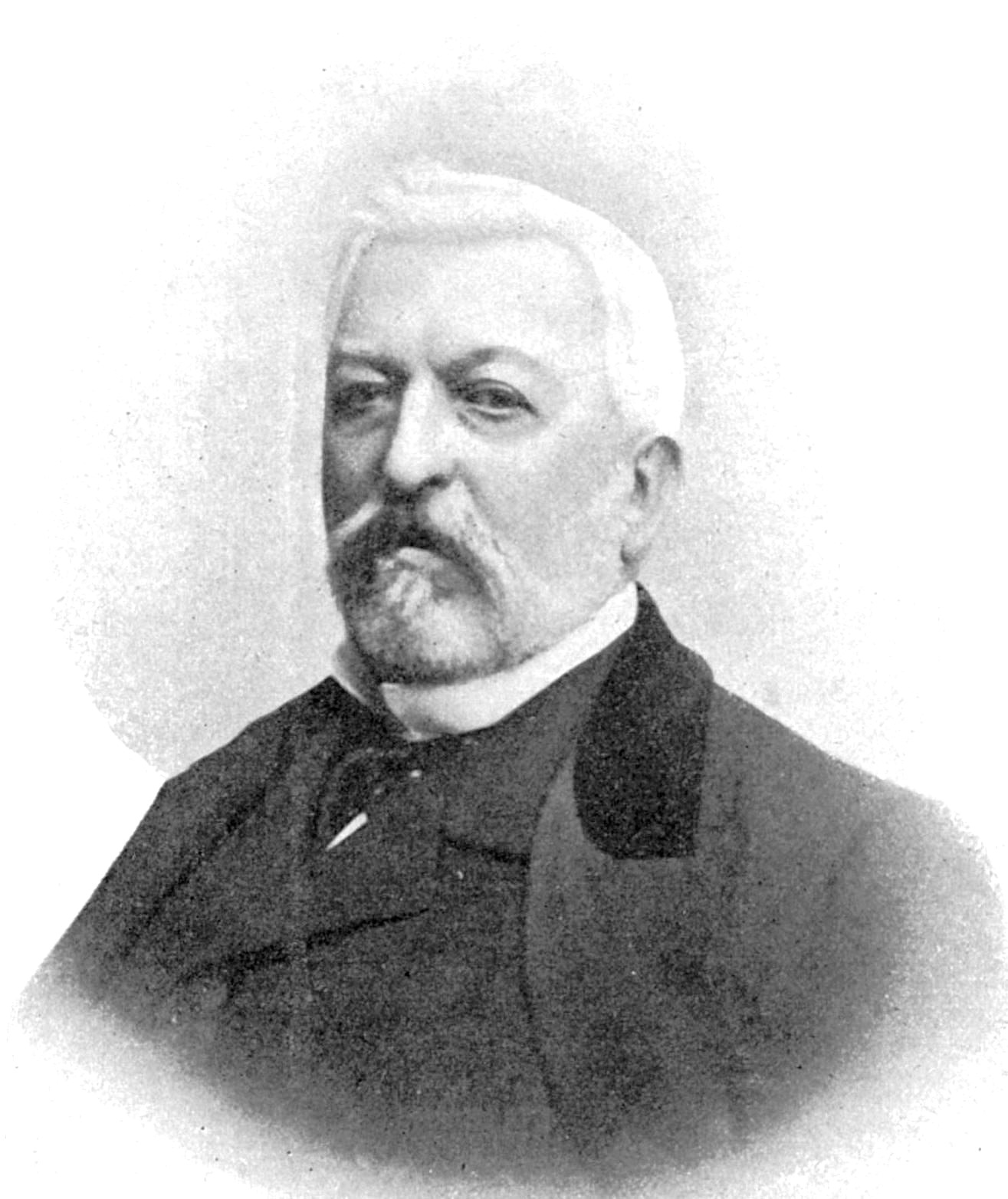

Jean Antoine Ernest Constans (3 May 1833 – 7 April 1913) was a French politician and colonial administrator.

== Biography ==
Born in Béziers, Hérault, he began his career as professor of law. In 1876 he was elected deputy for Toulouse to the French Third Republic's Chamber, and sat in the Left Centre as one of the 363 of 16 May 1877. Re-elected in October 1877, he joined Louis de Freycinet as Minister of the Interior in May 1880, holding this portfolio until November 1881. In 1887–1888, he was the first Governor-General of French Indochina. On 22 February 1889 he assumed the same office in Pierre Tirard's cabinet.

He became prominent as a stalwart opponent of the Boulangist party, constituting the Senate as a high court of justice, and taking police measures against the Ligue des patriotes. He resigned on 1 March 1890 but his resignation involved the fall of the cabinet, and he resumed his portfolio in the Freycinet cabinet the same month.

On 29 December 1889 he was elected senator by the département of the Haute-Garonne. He was violently attacked by the press and the Boulangist deputies but did not resign until the whole cabinet withdrew, on 26 February 1892. In December 1898 he was appointed ambassador to the Ottoman Empire and remained in office until 1909. His attempt to join the Senate in 1912 was unsuccessful.
