= Keeper of the Seals, Minister of Justice =

Government ministry of France

- Garde des Sceaux, ministre de la Justice
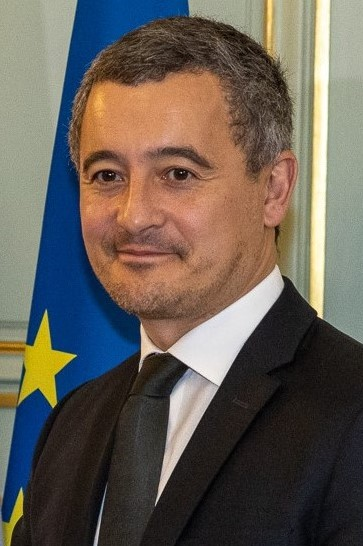
- Incumbent; Gérald Darmanin since 23 December 2024
- Ministry of Justice
- Member of: Cabinet
- Reports to: President of the Republic; Prime Minister
- Seat: Place Vendôme, Paris
- Nominator: Prime Minister
- Term length: No fixed term
- Formation: c. 497 c. 750: office of Keeper of the Seals of France; 1790: Ministry of Justice
- Website: www.justice.gouv.fr

Minister of Justice (French: Ministre de la Justice), formally known as Keeper of the Seals, Minister of Justice (Garde des Sceaux, ministre de la Justice [ɡaʁd de so ministʁ d(ə) la ʒystis]), is a cabinet position in the Government of France. The current minister of justice has been Gérald Darmanin since 2024. The ministry is headquartered on Place Vendôme in the 1st arrondissement of Paris.

== Function ==
The roles of the minister are to:

- oversee the building, maintenance and administration of courts;
- sit as vice president of the Judicial Council (which oversees the judicial performance and advises on prosecutiorial performance);
- supervise public prosecutions;
- direct corrections and the prison system
- propose legislation affecting civil or criminal law or procedure.

The Minister of Justice also holds the ceremonial office of Keeper of the Seals of France and is custodian of the Great Seal of France. This symbolic role is still shown in the order of words of the minister's official designation, Minister of Justice, Keeper of the Seals (Ministre de la Justice, garde des Sceaux).

France's Ministry of Justice might oversee the administration of justice in French Guiana, French Polynesia, Guadeloupe, Martinique, Mayotte, New Caledonia, Réunion, Saint Barthélemy, Saint-Martin, Saint Pierre and Miquelon and Wallis and Futuna.

== See also ==
- Ministry of Justice (France)
- List of ministers of justice of France
- Prison conditions in France
