= Chaumié =

Chaumié is a surname. Notable people with the surname include:

- Joseph Chaumié (1849–1919), French politician
- Pierre Chaumié (1880–1966), French politician
