= Resolution of the Dreyfus affair =

The resolution of the Dreyfus affair began with the decision of the Court of Cassation to annul the original 1894 conviction of Alfred Dreyfus and order a new trial. This decision was based on two "new facts": the attribution of the bordereau to Ferdinand Walsin Esterhazy and the secret communication of the "canaille de D..." document to Dreyfus' judges. The case was sent to a new court-martial in Rennes for retrial.

The Rennes trial, which began on 7 August 1899, was marked by intense public interest and military pressure. Despite evidence supporting Dreyfus' innocence, including Émile Zola's famous "J'Accuse…!" and the exposure of forged documents by Colonel Hubert-Joseph Henry, the court-martial again found Dreyfus guilty of treason. However, in a controversial decision, they cited "extenuating circumstances" and sentenced him to ten years' detention.

The verdict was met with international outrage and domestic turmoil. To quell the unrest, French President Émile Loubet pardoned Dreyfus on 19 September 1899, though this did not clear his name. The French government, led by Prime Minister Pierre Waldeck-Rousseau, passed an amnesty law in December 1900 to prevent further legal actions related to the affair. It wasn't until 1906 that Dreyfus was fully exonerated by the Court of Cassation, reinstated in the army, and awarded the Legion of Honour.

== Trial of Esterhazy for forgery ==
On the same day as this arrest the examining magistrate Bertulus, disregarding the threats and entreaties directed at him, on his own initiative (as an official note put it) sent Major Esterhazy and his mistress, Marguerite Pays, to prison on the charge of forgery and of using forgeries. He had become convinced that the "Speranza" telegram was the work of Madame Pays, and that they were not altogether innocent of the sending of the "Blanche" telegram. Then, when Bertulus had decided to send Esterhazy and his mistress before the Assize Court, the Chambre des Mises en Accusation interfered and gave them the benefit of insufficient evidence (August 12), and also declared that the complicity of Du Paty had not been sufficiently proved.

After being acquitted, Esterhazy was set free; but he did not come out of this troublesome adventure unscathed. Already, in his speech of July 7, Godefroy Cavaignac had announced that this officer would "receive the disciplinary punishments he deserved," and transferred his case to a disciplinary board. Before this board, presided over by General de St. Germain, Esterhazy, trying to avenge himself, made revelations which were most compromising for himself as well as for his protectors. He told of his collusion with the General Staff and of his threatening letters to the president of the Republic. Nevertheless, the board declined to find him guilty of having failed either in discipline or in matters of honor; they sustained only (and by a majority of one) the charge of "habitual misconduct." Notwithstanding a letter from General Zurlinden, military governor of Paris, recommending indulgence, Esterhazy's name was struck off the army lists by the minister of war (August 31).

== The Henry forgery ==
But just at this time an incident of far greater importance changed the aspect of affairs. Cavaignac, in spite of his self-assurance, had nonetheless been agitated by the doubts expressed on all sides as to the authenticity of certain documents in his dossier. In order to ease his mind he ordered a general review and a reclassification of the secret dossier. In the course of this operation Major Cuignet, working by artificial light, noticed an alarming peculiarity in the "Henry document": the lines on the paper—which was ruled in squares—were not of uniform colour. When he looked at the document supplied by Lieutenant-Colonel Henry himself for comparison he found, by comparing the ruled squares, that the heading and the lower part of the document did not match, the note being a composite of two papers, one dating from 1894, the other from 1896. Much alarmed by his discovery, Cuignet apprised the chief of the cabinet (General Roget) and the minister, Cavaignac. The conviction of these two, hitherto unshaken by the nonsense and the improbability of the "Vercingétorix document"—as Esterhazy had called it—gave way before the mismatch of the squares ruled on the paper. Cavaignac, for motives still unknown, kept the matter secret for a fortnight. Then, as Henry was passing through Paris, he summoned him to the War Office and questioned him in the presence of Generals de Boisdeffre, Gonse, and Roget. Henry began by swearing that the document was authentic, then got entangled in confused explanations, suggesting that he had completed certain parts of it "from oral information"; in the end, conquered by the evidence against him, he admitted that he had forged the document. Generals de Boisdeffre and Gonse, who in 1896 had accepted this forgery without question, now kept a frigid silence. Abandoned by the chiefs who had tacitly driven him to the crime, Henry gave way entirely.

== Suicide of Henry ==
By order of the minister Henry was immediately put under arrest and confined at the prison of Mont-Valérien. The next day he cut his throat with a razor left in his possession, taking with him to the grave his secret and that of a great part of the "affaire" (31 August 1898). On the same day Esterhazy disappeared from Paris; it was known that he had taken refuge in Brussels, and then in London. Colonel Henry's admission gravely affected General Boisdeffre's position, for he had publicly proclaimed and affirmed to the minister of war the authenticity of the document. He immediately tendered his resignation as chief of staff and, despite Cavaignac's entreaties, insisted on its acceptance.

This double "coup de théâtre," at once made public, created a tremendous sensation at first. The enemies of revision were overwhelmed; it took days before they had sufficiently recovered to rally round the theory of a "patriotic forgery" advanced by a contributor to the Gazette de France, Charles Maurras. According to him, Henry had forged this document as a sort of summary for the public, because the "real proofs" could not be revealed without danger. This absurd theory (for if ever a document was intended exclusively for "internal use," this was it) was generally accepted by the Nationalists.

But public opinion had changed considerably, or was at least shaken. From here on, a revision of the Dreyfus case thenceforward seemed inevitable; the council of ministers investigated the matter. It was evident that if Colonel Henry had been obliged to forge a proof of Dreyfus's guilt in 1896, all elements of the dossier were suspect. Cavaignac refused to draw this inference—too honest to hush up Henry's forgery, he was too obstinate to retract his speech of July 7. He declared that he was more convinced than ever that Dreyfus was guilty, and tendered his resignation, which led to Brisson's firm decision to proceed toward revision (4 September).

== Zurlinden succeeds Cavaignac ==
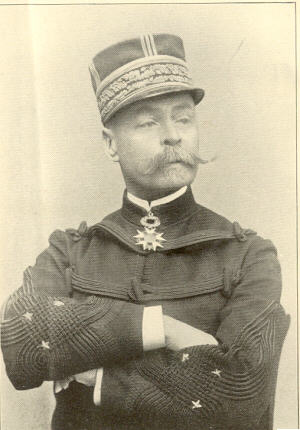
Émile Zurlinden.

General Zurlinden, governor of Paris, accepted the vacant post of minister of war at the personal request of the president of the republic. He was an honest soldier, but narrow-minded; insults in the press did not fail to affect him. A revision founded upon the discovery of "new facts" could only be demanded by the keeper of the seals. As early as September 3 Madame Dreyfus had laid before him a request to take this initiative. She claimed two "new facts":

1. The experts' examination of the bordereau, which she was informed had not given the same results as in 1894.
2. The confession of Henry's crime, which consequently annulled his all-important evidence against her husband.

As a result of this claim the keeper of the seals, Sarrien, demanded that the minister of war communicate to him the Dreyfus dossier. To the general surprise, Zurlinden sent it to him with a long notice unfavorable to revision.

== Ministerial changes ==
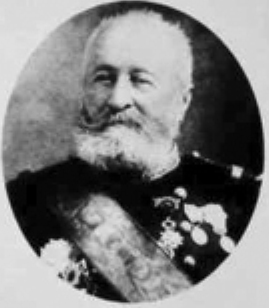
Charles Chanoine.

After a prolonged discussion, the ministry decided to proceed and to lay the matter before the judicial commission, which they were bound to consult in such a case. Thereupon Zurlinden tendered his resignation, and was followed in his retirement by the minister of public works, Tillaye (17 September). Zurlinden was reinstated as governor of Paris; General Charles Chanoine inherited his position in the War Office, as well as the insults of the anti-Revisionist press. During his short term of office Zurlinden, with an impartiality that showed more uprightness than discretion, had implicated two of the principal actors of the drama. It resulted from Esterhazy's declarations before his board of discipline, and from an inquiry opened in consequence, that Colonel Du Paty de Clam had sided with Esterhazy before and during his action. Du Paty took upon himself all the responsibility for his conduct, and asserted that he had acted without reference to his chiefs; this was chivalrous, but only half true. In any case, the assistance thus given to Esterhazy was judged "reprehensible from a military point of view": Du Paty was retired and put on half-pay for punishment (12 September). After Du Paty came Picquart. Zurlinden, having become acquainted with his dossier, proposed to the council of ministers to arraign Picquart before a court martial on the charge of having falsified the note called "petit bleu." The only possible basis for such an accusation consisted in certain signs of erasure in the document which had not existed in the photographs taken of it in 1896. The council was reluctant to embark on these proceedings, but Zurlinden, acting as governor of Paris, presented to his successor, general Chanoine, a warrant of inquiry, which the latter signed without paying much attention to it. The reason for this haste was that the keeper of seals had asked Picquart for a "mémoire" on the fitness of revision; the military party was therefore eager to discredit his testimony by a charge of forgery. On 21 September, the day on which the case of Picquart and Leblois was brought before the "tribunal correctionnel" the state attorney demanded the adjournment of the affair, first, on account of the Dreyfus revision, which might modify the charge against Picquart; and secondly, on account of the new and serious accusation which had been brought against him. Picquart then rose and warned his judges and the public, saying: "To-night perhaps I shall go to the Cherche-Midi, and this is probably the last time that I will be able to speak in public. I would have the world know that if the rope of Lemercier-Picard or the razor of Henry is found in my cell, I shall have been assassinated. No man like myself can for a moment think of suicide." (Lemercier-Picard was one of Henry's agents, whose real name was Leeman, and who had probably been implicated in the forgery of 1896 and afterward hanged himself under mysterious circumstances from the window-fastening of a rooming-house.) The next day Picquart was taken from the civil prison of La Santé and enrolled on the register at the Cherche-Midi, where he was put into the strictest solitary confinement.

Some days later, the vote of the commission charged with giving a preliminary finding concerning a revision was made known: opinion was equally divided. This division legally inferred rejection, but the minister of war was not bound to accept the opinion of the commission. He wished, however, to shield himself behind a vote of the council of ministers. After four hours of deliberation it was decided, at the instance of Brisson, seconded by Bourgeois, that the keeper of the seals should lay the case before the Court of Cassation. Thus the proceedings for revision were definitely inaugurated (27 September).

== Resignation of Brisson's ministry ==
Now that, thanks to the manly resolution of Henri Brisson, the obstinate defenders of the miscarriage of justice of 1894 were deprived of support, their only remaining hope lay in the revolutionary action of the army, of the people, or of the Chamber of Deputies. It will be seen how they used successively each of these three means. They were aided, on the one hand, by the thoughtless violence of certain apostles of revision who persisted in blaming the whole army for the misdeeds committed by some of its chiefs. The most extreme of these was Urbain Gohier, who was prosecuted (under Dupuy's ministry) for his collection of articles, "The Army Against the Nation," and acquitted by a jury of the Seine. On the other hand, the anti-revisionists were encouraged by the strange inactivity of the president of the republic. The day before the reopening of the Chamber of Deputies, sudden and suspicious strikes, noisy public meetings, struggles in the streets, reports of a military conspiracy, all contributed to overexcite the temper of the public. On the very day the Chamber of Deputies was reopened (25 October), Brisson's ministry was defeated on a motion which virtually accused the government of permitting the attacks upon the army, and it resigned forthwith.

== Trial before the Court of Cassation ==
The government was replaced on 3 November by a cabinet of "republican union" presided over by Charles Dupuy, with Freycinet at the War Office and Lebret as keeper of the seals. The Criminal Chamber of the Court of Cassation, having the demand for a revision laid before it, held public hearings on October 27 and 28 to decide upon the admissibility of the demand. State attorney Manau and councilor Bard, the latter in a very remarkable report, both pronounced themselves in favor of revision. They adopted the two motives for the request presented by Madame Dreyfus: the admitted forgery by Colonel Henry, and the report of the handwriting experts of 1897, tending to show that the bordereau was not in Dreyfus's handwriting, as had been claimed in 1894, but was "a tracing by Esterhazy." The state attorney, an old republican, was in favor of immediately annulling the sentence of 1894 and suspending the punishment of Dreyfus; the councilor Bard, mindful of the resistance of the military as expressed in Zurlinden's letter, proposed that the Criminal Chamber simply declare the claim "formally admissible" and proceed to a further inquiry which would set people's minds at rest. It was this last expedient that commended itself to the Criminal Chamber (29 October); it was further decided (3 November) that instead of appointing a special commission, the court as a whole should hold this supplementary inquiry. They began at once and heard, in greatest secrecy, a long series of witnesses, including Esterhazy, who, under indictment for swindling his cousin Christian Esterhazy, obtained a safe-conduct to Paris. On 15 November the Criminal Chamber decided that Dreyfus be informed of the commencement of proceedings for the revision and returned to France to present his defense. This was the first news that the unhappy man had heard of the campaign begun in his behalf.

Before the Court of Cassation, as in the actions against both Esterhazy and Zola, the principal witness for the revision was to be Colonel Picquart. To weaken the importance of his evidence and to retaliate for the revision, the military party wished to force the colonel's condemnation beforehand. The inquiry into his case, entrusted to Captain Tavernier, was quickly ended. On 24 November General Zurlinden, governor of Paris, signed the order demanding his trial before the court martial; he was charged with forging the "petit bleu," with using other forgeries, and with communicating secret documents concerning national defense. Numerous petitions from "intellectuals" protested against these hasty measures and demanded that the judgment of Picquart should be delayed until the result of the inquiry in the Court of Cassation should have put in its true light the part he had played in all this affair. The same opinion was expressed in the Chamber of Deputies by the deputies Bos, Millerand, and Poincaré, the latter being one of the ministers of 1894 who took advantage of this opportunity to "unburden his conscience."

Freycinet and Dupuy refused to postpone the court-martial but were willing to hamper it by allowing the Court of Cassation to claim the Picquart dossier. Finally, after a fruitless attempt by Waldeck-Rousseau to pass a law allowing the Supreme Court to suspend the case of Picquart, the colonel, who was awaiting trial before both the "tribunal correctionnel" and the court-martial, applied to the Court of Cassation to rule on the case. The court ordered that the two dossiers should be communicated to it, thus indefinitely postponing the meeting of the court-martial. (After the close of the inquiry, on March 3, 1899, the court decided that the Civil Court alone was concerned with the chief accusations against Picquart, and he was transferred from the military prison at Cherche-Midi to the civil prison of La Santé.)

After having almost terminated the hearing of the witnesses, the Criminal Chamber insisted upon having the secret dossier, withheld by military authority, communicated to it. This request met with strenuous opposition; the matter was even taken up before the Chamber of Deputies (19 December). The government, however, before deciding, required safeguards against indiscreet publication; the measure, accepted by the Court of Cassation (27 December), consisted of an officer of the War Office carrying the dossier every day to court and to bringing it back to the War Office in the evening.

== Attacks on the court ==
While the Criminal Court was proceeding with its inquiry, notwithstanding the secrecy with which all its movements were surrounded, rumors were spreading that the decision would favour revision. To avoid this catastrophe at any price, the enemies of revision commenced a violent campaign in the newspapers, defaming the magistrates of the Criminal Chamber, who were represented as having been required to sell themselves to the cause of Dreyfus. The Ligue de la Patrie Française ("League of French Patriots"), founded in January 1899, under the auspices of the academicians François Coppée and Jules Lemaitre, energetically seconded this campaign and demanded that these "disqualified" judges be discharged from the case. The president of the Civil Chamber of the court, Quesnay de Beaurepaire, was willing to lend the support of his high office to these calumnies; he tendered his resignation as a judge (8 January 1899), and began in L'Echo de Paris a series of articles against his colleagues. His most serious charge was that President Loew, at the end of a long and tiring sitting, had sent Picquart a glass of hot grog.

The astonishment of the public was intensified when on 30 January the government presented a bill demanding that the affair be judged by the united sections of the whole Court of Cassation. Dupuy argued that the bill was a measure of pacification; it was necessary that the decision—and why did the Revisionists fear that the whole Court of Cassation would disavow the Criminal Chamber?—should have such force that nobody but "fools or rebels" would be found to contest it. These arguments, and above all the fear of provoking a ministerial crisis, triumphed over the resistance of a part of the republicans. The "loi de dessaisissement" was passed by the Chamber of Deputies (10 February), and a little later by the Senate (28 February).

== The death of Félix Faure ==
In the interval between the taking of these two votes an important event had occurred—the sudden death of the president, Félix Faure (16 February). The congress which immediately assembled set aside the candidateship of all those who had been to a greater or less degree involved in the Dreyfus affair (Méline, Brisson, Dupuy), and fixed its choice on the president of the Senate, Emile Loubet, who had preserved up to that time, and who continued to preserve, a consistently neutral attitude. Nevertheless, as he was the choice of the Senate and of the Revisionists in the Chamber, his nomination awakened the fury of the nationalists, anti-Semites, and reactionaries. On different sides conspirators tried to take advantage of the general disorder and attempted a decisive stroke. The Orléanist pretender advanced closer to the frontier. At Félix Faure's funeral (23 February) the leaders of the League of Patriots, Déroulède and Marcel Habert, tried to induce General Roget's brigade to proceed to the Elysée. The two agitators were arrested, brought before the jury of the Seine for "misdemeanor in the press," and acquitted (May 31).

The Criminal Chamber had ended its inquiry on 9 February; immediately after the vote for the "loi de dessaisissement" the whole proceeding was turned over to the Court of Cassation. The latter accepted without question the results obtained, heard several new witnesses, and had the secret dossiers, both military and diplomatic, laid before it. It was still engaged in studying them when the newspaper Le Figaro obtained and published, beginning on March 31, the complete reports of the proceedings of the inquiry, printed for the private use of the councilors. The effect of this publication was widespread. For the first time the general public had all the factors of the case before its eyes and could reason out an opinion for itself. The result of the inquiry was the melting away of all the pretended proofs of Dreyfus's guilt as inferred from the secret dossier: not a single one had withstood an impartial examination, and in the course of the inquiry many documents were recognized as false or as having been tampered with.

The spokesmen of the General Staff, General Roget, Major Cuignet, and Cavaignac, now returned to the bordereau, and struggled to show that the information enumerated therein could have been betrayed only by Dreyfus. But attributing the bordereau to Dreyfus clashed with the declaration of the new experts appointed by the Criminal Chamber (Paul Meyer, Giry, Molinier), who were unanimous in attributing it to Esterhazy. One of the experts, Charavay, who in 1894 had found against Dreyfus, retracted his previous opinion when Esterhazy's writing was put before him. Lastly, a search, made as early as November, put the court in possession of two letters acknowledged by Esterhazy, written on the same "pelure" paper (foreign note-paper) as the bordereau; a search had been made in vain for samples of this paper in Dreyfus' house, and in 1897 Esterhazy had denied that he had ever used it.

== The Panizzardi telegram ==
The most remarkable incident before the court was the presentation of the Panizzardi telegram of 2 November 1894. Instead of the true telegram, which quite exonerated Dreyfus, the secret military dossier communicated to the Court of Cassation contained only a false version, put together "from memory" in 1898 by Colonel Henry. In the course of his deposition Major Cuignet tried to justify this false version, and accused the Foreign Ministry of bad faith. A somewhat animated correspondence took place between the two ministries on this subject. However, the delegate of the Foreign Ministry, Paléologue, had no trouble in confounding his opponent, and on April 27 Cuignet and General Chanoine, in the name of the War Ministry, signed a statement recognizing the accuracy of the official interpretation. This incident had a parliamentary echo. On May 5 De Freycinet tendered his resignation from the War Ministry rather abruptly. He was replaced by Krantz, until then Minister of Public Works.

In spite of strong prejudice on the part of many of the councilors charged with the examination of the case, the inquiry of the united court strikingly confirmed the results of the inquiry of the Criminal Chamber. The president of the Civil Chamber, Ballot-Beaupré, was entrusted with drawing up a report, which he read in the open court on May 29. Visibly affected, he declared that the bordereau was the work of Esterhazy: this fact being proved, even if it did not allow of Esterhazy's acquittal being overthrown, was sufficient to demonstrate Dreyfus' innocence; this was, according to Ballot-Beaupré, the "new fact" required by law for a revision. Manau, the attorney-general, in his address to the court brought forward a second "new fact"—Henry's forgery. After a masterly speech by Mornard, acting on behalf of the Dreyfus family, the Court of Cassation retired for deliberation. In their decision, rendered June 3, they set aside the "fin de non recevoir" (refusal to consider) inferred either from the secret dossier or from the pretended confessions of Dreyfus, judged not proved and improbable. They retained two "new facts": one, recognized by all, the fresh attribution of the bordereau; the other, the secret communication made to the judges of Dreyfus, of the document "canaille de D...," now considered by everyone as inapplicable to the prisoner. Accordingly, the Court of Cassation annulled the sentence of 1894, and ordered that Dreyfus be tried again before a court martial at Rennes.

The day before this memorable decree Esterhazy declared to a reporter of "Le Matin" that he was indeed the author of the bordereau; but he asserted that he had written it "by order," to furnish his friend, Colonel Sandherr (whose secret agent he pretended to have been), with a material proof against the traitor Dreyfus.

== The court martial at Rennes ==
The presumptions admitted by the Court of Cassation in favour of the innocence of Dreyfus were so powerful that, according to general opinion, the judgment of the court martial at Rennes could be nothing but a mere formality, destined to procure for Dreyfus the supreme satisfaction of being rehabilitated by his peers. But after the lies, the hatred, and the insults which had accumulated during the last two years, after the work of demoralization accomplished by the press of both parties, the overexcited army had now reached the point of pinning its own honor on the shame of Dreyfus. Its suspicions having been successfully roused against civil justice, it refused to bow down before the work of the latter, straightforward as it was. As Renault Morlière had foretold, the only effect that the "loi de dessaisissement" had was to direct upon the whole Court of Cassation the suspicions and the invective reserved up to this time for the Criminal Chamber alone.

The first victim of this fresh outburst of passion was the Dupuy ministry. This "ministère de bascule" (flip-flop ministry), after having done everything in its power to retard the work of justice, now seemed to ready to accept it without any reserve and to draw the necessary conclusion. The cruiser Sfax, stationed at Martinique, was ordered to bring Dreyfus back to France. Du Paty de Clam was arrested on the charge of having taken part in the Henry forgery, an accusation rashly made by Major Cuignet, bound to be rejected for lack of evidence.

General Pellieux was brought before a board of inquiry for collusion with Esterhazy; Esterhazy himself was prosecuted for the affair of the "liberating document". The Cabinet felt itself threatened by the indignation of all sections of the Republican party, and made fresh advances to the "Dreyfusards". On June 5 the Chamber of Deputies voted the public placarding of the court's decision—a necessary step in view of similar action taken following Cavaignac's speech of July 7. Moreover, the cabinet proposed to the Chamber to bring before the Senate an action against General Mercier, on the grounds of the secret communication made to the judges of 1894.

But the Chamber, which had acclaimed Cavaignac and overthrown Brisson, hesitated to start upon the course of retaliation into which Dupuy was urging it. It found a deputy (Ribot) to declare that the ministry was encroaching upon its prerogatives, and another (Pourquery de Boisserin) to propose the postponement of any decision until the court-martial of Rennes had rendered its decree. This last proposition rallied the majority; nobody realized that, in thus connecting Mercier's indemnity with a fresh condemnation of Dreyfus, the nature of the trial at Rennes was transformed from a legal debate to a duel between a captain and a general.

== Defeat of Dupuy ministry ==
The Dupuy cabinet was finally overthrown (June 12), and the groups on the Left, facing the danger of a threatening military pronouncement, decided to uphold nothing but a ministry of "Republican defense." On June 22 Waldeck-Rousseau succeeded in forming a cabinet, in which General Marquis de Galliffet was Minister of War.

The Sfax, with Dreyfus on board, arrived on July 1 at Port Houliguen, near Quiberon. Hurriedly disembarked on a stormy night, he was immediately transferred to the military prison of Rennes. After five years of physical and moral torture, which he had survived only by a miracle of will-power, the unhappy man had been reduced to a pitiable state of bodily and mental exhaustion. For five weeks the attorneys chosen by his family, Demange and Labori, were busy acquainting him as far as possible with the remarkable events that had occurred during his absence; his attitude while the trial was progressing proved he had difficulty realizing the situation.

The trial began on 7 August, in one of the rooms of the lycée at Rennes. The court-martial was composed entirely of artillery officers, except the president, Colonel Jouaust, who belonged to the corps of engineers. The public prosecutor was Major Carrière, a retired gendarme, who had begun to study law at the age of sixty. In accordance with legal requirements, the indictment was in substance the same as at the previous trial; the only question put to the court was whether Dreyfus had delivered up the documents enumerated in the bordereau. It appeared, therefore, that only witnesses who could give evidence on this point would be heard, and such, in fact, were the instructions issued by the Ministry of War, but these directives were respected neither by the prosecution, nor by the defense. Hence the Rennes trial was but a repetition of the interminable string of witnesses who had already been heard at Zola's trial and in the Court of Cassation, most of whom only brought forward opinions, suppositions, or tales absolutely foreign to the question. The generals, forming a compact group which this time worked under Mercier's personal direction, delivered regular harangues and continually interfered in the debate; the president, a mere Colonel overawed by his superior officers, exhibited as much deference to them as he showed harshness and sharpness to Dreyfus. From the beginning to end of the trial he made no pretence of keeping account of the facts duly established by the Court of Cassation. Esterhazy's admissions, intermixed, it is true, with lies, were held as being null and void. The voluminous correspondence he addressed to Jouaust and Carrière was discarded. The questions asked by one of the judges indicated that someone had told him the pretended "original bordereau" had been annotated by the Emperor Wilhelm himself, and merely copied by Esterhazy.

The examination of Dreyfus himself was without interest; he confined himself to denials, and preserved an entirely military attitude, the exaggerated correctness of which did not win much sympathy. Several hearings behind closed doors were devoted to the examination of the military and diplomatic secret dossiers. General Chanoine, delegate of the War Office, had (as explained by him later, through inadvertence) again incorporated in them the false version of the Panizzardi telegram, together with a commentary from Du Paty.

General Mercier's evidence (12 August), announced with much parade and bustle, was put forward in a clever speech, but brought out nothing new, unless it were a note from the Austrian military attaché, Schneider, which Mercier had procured by undisclosed means. In this note the Austrian diplomat declared that he persisted in "believing" in the guilt of Dreyfus. The note was of the year 1895 or 1896; but a false date had been written on the copy, "30 November 1897"—a date later than the discovery of Esterhazy's handwriting, and by which, as a matter of fact, Schneider had completely changed his opinion. Called upon to explain the part he played in 1894, Mercier admitted, this time without hesitation, the communication of the secret dossier, took credit for it himself, and declared that if necessary he was ready to do it again.

== Labori shot ==
On 14 August an unknown person, who succeeded in escaping, fired a revolver at Labori and wounded him severely in the back. For more than a week the intrepid advocate was prevented from attending the hearing.

Presentation of all the evidence, with endless details, continued for nearly another month, at the rate of two sittings a day. The most notable witnesses were Casimir-Perier, Commander Freystaetter (one of the judges of 1894)—both in violent opposition to Mercier-Charavay, who, though seriously ill, came loyally forward to acknowledge his error of 1894, and Bertillon, who repeated his claims as to the "autoforgery" of the bordereau, adding fresh complications. At the last moment Colonel Jouaust, behind closed doors, using his discretionary power, took unsworn testimony from a Serbian named Czernuski, formerly an Austrian officer. This man, who was generally considered unhinged, told a confused story of how a civil official and a staff officer "of a Central European Power" had assured him that Dreyfus was a spy. Although this story was worthless, Labori took advantage of it to demand in turn that the evidence of Schwartzkoppen and Panizzardi be admitted. This was refused. The German government, on its part, inserted a notice in the official gazette of Berlin (8 September), repeating in formal terms the statement made by the chancellor von Bülow on 24 January 1898 before a commission of the Reichstag, declaring that the German government had never had any dealings whatever with Dreyfus.

Major Carrière's summation to the court restated that Dreyfus was guilty. He argued that at the beginning of the trial he had hoped to be able to demonstrate Dreyfus' innocence, but "this mass of witnesses who have come to give us information and personal opinions" had destroyed that hope. Of Dreyfus' two attorneys only Demange addressed the court. His speech was long, well reasoned, and touching, but he weakened it by making it too polite and by too gentle toward all officers, not excepting the late Colonel Henry.

In his rejoinder Carrière asked the judges to group the witnesses into two divisions and to weigh their evidence. Demange begged the court not to raise to the dignity of proof such "possibilities of presumptions" as had been brought forward. Finally, Dreyfus uttered these simple words:

"I am absolutely sure, I affirm before my country and before the army, that I am innocent. It is with the sole aim of saving the honor of my name, and of the name that my children bear, that for five years I have undergone the most frightful tortures. I am convinced that I shall attain this aim to-day, thanks to your honesty and to your sense of justice."

== The verdict ==
An hour later Dreyfus heard the verdict that ruined all his hopes and those of justice: by five votes to two the court-martial declared him guilty. Rumor had it that the two votes for acquittal were those of Colonel Jouaust (who throughout the trial had carefully concealed his opinion) and of Lieutenant-Colonel de Bréon, a fervent Catholic, the brother of a Paris curate. However, as if to acknowledge the lingering doubts, the court ruled that there were "extenuating circumstances"—a thing unheard of and incomprehensible in a matter of treason. The sentence pronounced was detention for ten years: it was known that the judges had recommended the condemned man to the indulgence of the War Office (9 September 1899).

The civilized world was amazed and indignant at the announcement of the sentence. In France itself nobody was satisfied, except General Mercier, who was delivered by this halting pronouncement from all fear of punishment. For several days the ministry hesitated as to what course to pursue. Finally, the idea of immediately pardoning Dreyfus, initiated by some of the prisoner's friends who were alarmed at his state of health, prevailed in government circles. It proved difficult to induce the president of the republic to grant the pardon, and Dreyfus to accept it; for in order to avail himself of it the prisoner was forced to withdraw the appeal he had lodged against his sentence. Later on, disingenuous political parties construed this withdrawal as the admission of guilt. Finally, on 19 September, the very day on which Scheurer-Kestner died, the presidential decree appeared, remitting the whole of the punishment of Dreyfus, including the military degradation. The decree was preceded by a report from the Minister of War, reciting various reasons for clemency. Then by an ordre du jour, which he did not communicate even to the president of the council, General Galliffet announced to the army that the incident was closed.

On 20 September Dreyfus was set free. He immediately wrote to the president of the republic a letter in which he reaffirmed his innocence, together with his resolve to know no rest or peace until his honor was restored. He retired with his family to Carpentras, then to Geneva, and finally returned to settle in Paris, without causing public demonstration. The long struggle for justice thus came to a paradoxical end. Dreyfus, liberated and restored to his family, innocent in the eyes of the world, remained excluded from the army and legally dishonored. In the senatorial elections of 1900 all the notable "Dreyfusards" (Ranc, Siegfried, Thévenet) were not elected; it was only at the legislative elections of 1902 that the tide began to turn and some of the champions of revision (Pressensé, Jaurès, Buisson) were returned to the Chamber of Deputies.

== Pardon and amnesty ==
The sentence of Rennes left unsettled several cases more or less connected with the Dreyfus case: proceedings against Picquart for infraction of the law against espionage; an action for libel by Henry's widow against Joseph Reinach; an action against Zola (whose condemnation by default was not definitive); eventual proceedings against General Mercier, etc. Waldeck-Rousseau's ministry considered that the people were tired of an "affaire" that had paralyzed the business of the country, and had brought it to the brink of a civil war; for it had become known that if Dreyfus had been acquitted the leaders of the anti-Revisionists—Déroulède, Marcel Habert, Jules Guérin—were determined to stage a coup d'état. To prevent this, they were arrested (12 August) for conspiracy against the state, and condemned to banishment or prison. The ministry introduced a bill declaring that all actions for matters connected with the Dreyfus affair, excepting those for the crimes of murder and treason, were null and void. It was the "policy of the sponge" praised by the journalist Cornély. It met with keen opposition from the convinced adherents of Dreyfus; they saw in it an immoral stifling of justice, and they succeeded in protracting the discussion of the bill. In the meantime all such cases remained unsettled. But events convinced Waldeck-Rousseau still further of the necessity for a pacific measure. In May, 1900, the mere hint of reviving the "affaire" had favored the success of the Nationalist candidates in the municipal elections of Paris. The resignation of General Galliffet, on 30 May 1900, on a side issue of the "affaire" and the almost unanimous vote by the Chamber of an "ordre du jour" against the reopening of the case, encouraged the government to insist on the voting for the bill. After long debate it was definitely adopted on 24 December 1900.

In the course of the discussion Waldeck-Rousseau stigmatized General Mercier's conduct in 1894, and consoled the defenders of Dreyfus by making an appeal to historical justice. Of the three most notable champions of revision, Scheurer-Kestner had died; Zola returned to France, where he died from an accident on 29 September 1902; Colonel Picquart, indignant at the amnesty, abandoned the appeal he had lodged against the decision of the board of inquiry—very much open to criticism—which had struck him from the lists, and left the army by way of protest. However, he served as Minister of War from 25 October 1906 to 24 July 1909.
