= Joseph Chaumié =

French politician

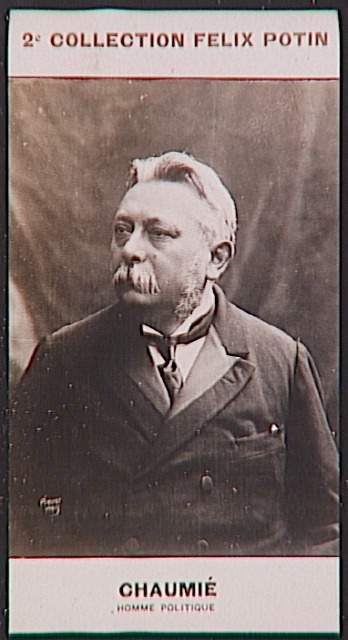
Joseph Chaumié

Joseph Chaumié (17 March 1849 – 19 July 1919) was a French politician, Senator for Lot-et-Garonne from 1897 until his death.

Joseph Chaumié was born in Agen, Lot-et-Garonne, into a family of modest means. He studied law at the Sorbonne in Paris and although he was a successful student, he was unsuccessful in obtaining permission to practice at the bar in Paris, probably due to the influence of police reports which described him as a revolutionary. He returned to Agen where he practised law.

In 1886, he was elected to the town council in Agen and served as mayor from 1896 to 1900. He was elected to the Senate in 1897. He was one of those who worked with René Waldeck-Rousseau to create the Democratic Republican Alliance, of which he was vice-president. A highly regarded orator and active member of the Senate, he served as Education minister 1902 to 1905 in the government of Émile Combes and then Justice minister in until 1906 in the second and third governments of Maurice Rouvier. Under Combes, he oversaw the integration of the staff of the École Normale Supérieure into the University of Paris. He represented the government at Émile Zola's funeral and other key events. He was a strong supporter of the separation of church and state enshrined in the 1905 French law on the Separation of the Churches and the State, a law which had a great impact on education.

After he left government he became involved in a dispute with Maurice Bunau-Varilla's newspaper Le Matin, which accused him of nepotism and favouritism. He claimed that he was being attacked because he refused to share documents on the Dreyfus affair with the paper and began a libel (diffamation) action, eventually winning his case. These events put a strain on his health and he was afterwards much less active in the Senate.

He died at Clermont-Dessous in Lot-et-Garonne in 1919. His sons Jacques (1877–1920), Pierre (1880–1966), and Emmanuel (1890–1934), were all active in politics.

Political offices
Preceded by Georges Leygues	Minister of National Education; 1902–1905	Succeeded by Jean-Baptiste Bienvenu-Martin
Preceded by Ernest Vallé	Minister of Justice; 1905–1906	Succeeded by Ferdinand Sarrien
