= Jules Méline =

Prime Minister of France from 1896 to 1898

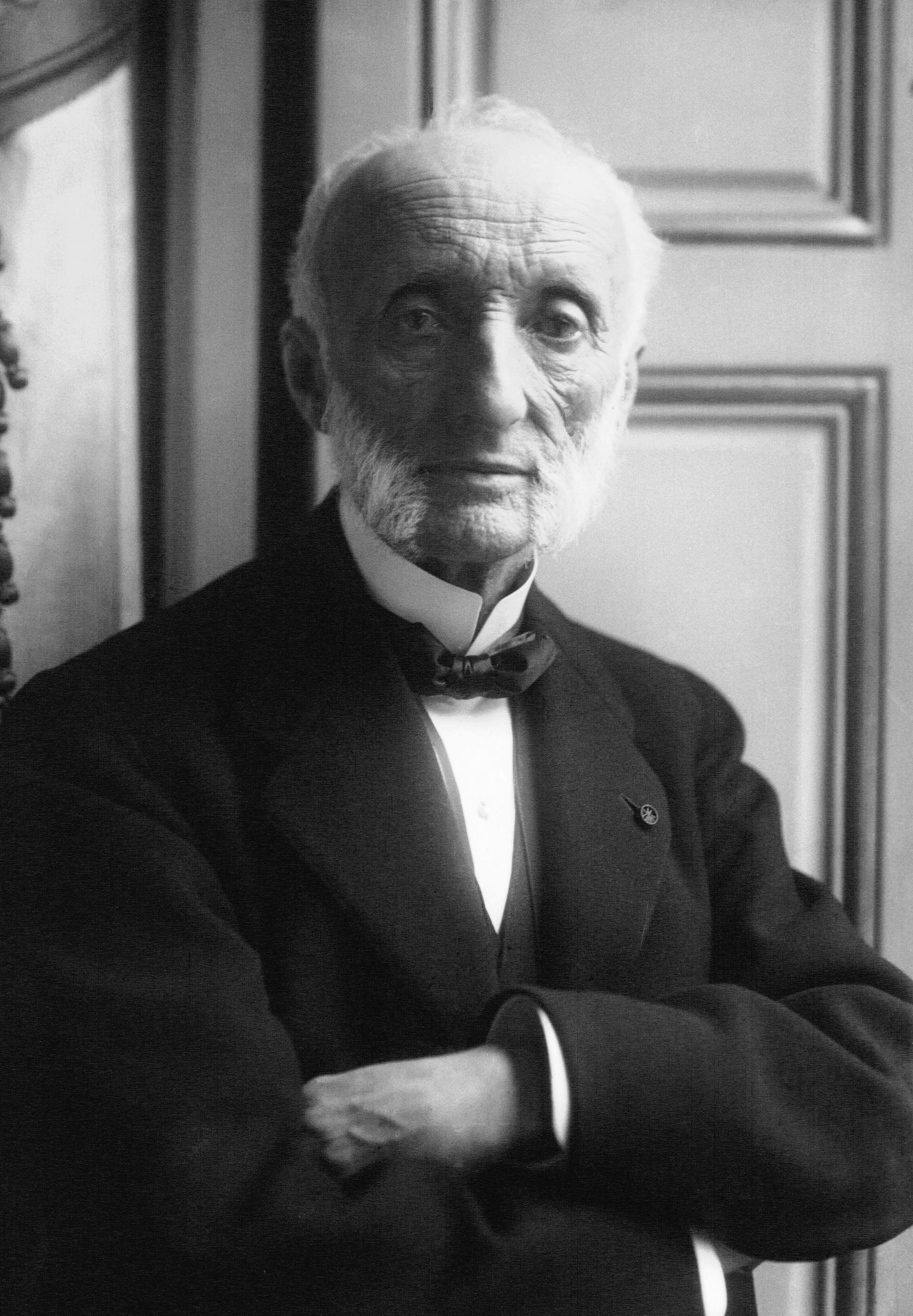
- Méline in 1915

Prime Minister of France
- In office 29 April 1896 – 28 June 1898
- President: Félix Faure
- Preceded by: Léon Bourgeois
- Succeeded by: Henri Brisson

President of the Chamber of Deputies
- In office 4 April 1888 – 11 November 1889
- Preceded by: Charles Floquet
- Succeeded by: Charles Floquet

Personal details
- Born: 20 May 1838 Remiremont, Kingdom of France
- Died: 21 December 1925 (aged 87) Paris, France
- Party: Progressive Republican (1870–1903); Republican Federation (1903–1910s)

Félix Jules Méline (French: [ʒyl melin]; 20 May 1838 – 21 December 1925) was a French statesman, Prime Minister of France from 1896 to 1898.

== Biography ==
Méline was born at Remiremont. Having taken up law as his profession, he was chosen a deputy in 1872, and in 1879 he was for a short time Under-Secretary to the Minister of the Interior. In 1880 he came to the fore as the leading spokesman of the party which favoured the protection of French industries, and he had a considerable share in fashioning the protectionist legislation of the years 1890–1902. From 1883 to 1885, Méline was Minister for Agriculture, and in 1888–1889 he was President of the Chamber of Deputies. In 1896 he became Premier (Président du Conseil) and Minister for Agriculture. His tenure in these roles ended in 1898, after losing the confidence of the Chamber of Deputies following the 1898 French legislative election, being succeeded as Premier by Henri Brisson.

At one time he edited La République francaise, and after his retirement from public life he wrote Le Retour de la terre et Ia surproduction industrielle, tout en faveur de l'agriculture (1905).

The French protectionist measure of 1892, the Méline tariff, is named after him.

In social policy, Méline's premiership is notable for the introduction in April 1898 of a workmen’s compensation law. Also during his premiership, in 1897 the privilege of the Bank of France was renewed with the stipulation (as noted by one study) “that it provides farmers with forty million francs (plus an additional two million each year) in the form of low-interest loans.” A law of July the 17th 1897 authorized an existing insurance fund (as noted by one study) “to make the sum payable in the event of death divisible among several beneficiaries (literally to make mixed insurances in the event of death).” In addition, a law was passed on April the 19th of 1898 for (As noted by one study) “the repression of disorder, acts of violence, acts of cruelty, and assaults on children,” and an Act of April the 21st 1898 set up an accident fund for seamen. In addition, a law of April the 1st 1898 released mutual aid societies (as noted by one study) “from close administrative control and extended their field of activities.” These reforms reflected Méline's views, who back in 1891 had declared that ‘the best form of socialism…would be that of producing work for our workers, of improving their conditions and…of raising their wages and improving their welfare.’

== Méline's Ministry ==
Méline's Ministry, 29 April 1896 – 28 June 1898:

- Jules Méline – President of the Council and Minister of Agriculture
- Gabriel Hanotaux – Minister of Foreign Affairs
- Jean-Baptiste Billot – Minister of War
- Louis Barthou – Minister of the Interior
- Georges Cochery – Minister of Finance
- Jean-Baptiste Darlan – Minister of Justice
- Armand Louis Charles Gustave Besnard – Minister of Marine
- Alfred Rambaud – Minister of Public Instruction, Fine Arts, and Worship
- André Lebon – Minister of Colonies
- Adolphe Turrel – Minister of Public Works
- Henry Boucher – Minister of Commerce, Industry, Posts, and Telegraphs

Changes

- 26 September 1896 – Jean-Baptiste Darlan succeeds Rambaud as Minister of Worship, remaining also Minister of Justice. Rambaud remains Minister of Public Instruction and Fine Arts.
- 1 December 1897 – Victor Milliard succeeds Darlan as Minister of Justice and Worship.
- 31 May 1898 – Gabriel Hanotaux succeeds Lebon as interim Minister of Colonies, remaining also Minister of Foreign Affairs.

== Notes ==
Political offices
Preceded by François de Mahy	Minister of Agriculture; 1883–1885	Succeeded by Hervé Mangon
Preceded by Charles Floquet	President of the Chamber of Deputies; 1888–1889	Succeeded by Charles Floquet
Preceded by Léon Bourgeois	Prime Minister of France; 1896–1898	Succeeded by Henri Brisson
Preceded by Albert Viger	Minister of Agriculture; 1896–1898	Succeeded by Albert Viger
