= Ernest Vallé =

French politician

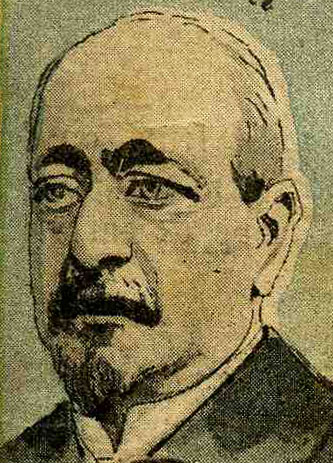
- Portrait from Le Pèlerin, 22 June 1902

Minister of Justice
- In office 7 June 1902 – 18 January 1905
- Preceded by: Ernest Monis
- Succeeded by: Joseph Chaumié

Personal details
- Born: 19 September 1845
- Died: 24 January 1920 (aged 74)
- Occupation: Lawyer

Ernest Vallé (19 September 1845 – 24 January 1920) was a French lawyer and politician who was Minister of Justice from 1902 to 1905.

== Early years (1845–1889) ==
Ernest Vallé was born on 19 September 1845 in Avize, Marne. For his secondary education he attended the lycée of Épernay and then the lycée of Reims. He then studied law in Paris. He was secretary to Désiré Médéric Le Blond (1812–86), who was later senator for the Marne, and then to Ernest Cresson (1824–1902), who later became president of the bar association.

Vallé joined the Paris Bar in 1867. He participated in the Republican youth movement opposed to the Second French Empire. During the Franco-Prussian War of 1870–71 he served in the garde mobile in defense of Paris. Vallé was engaged in many civil cases as a barrister in the Court of Appeal, some of which were widely discussed. He continued to serve as a barrister after being elected to public office. In 1886, he was elected general councilor of the canton of Avize, Marne.

== Deputy (1889–1898) ==
In the general elections of 1889 Vallé was elected deputy for Épernay in the first round on voting. He was rapporteur of the commission inquiring into the Panama scandals in 1892, and published the report that he wrote on the subject. He was reelected in 1893 and 1898. He was appointed under-secretary of state for the Interior in the second ministry of Henri Brisson, formed on 28 June 1898. The cabinet was dissolved a few weeks later after losing a vote of confidence over the Dreyfus affair. He left office on 26 October 1898.

== Senator (1898–1920) ==
Vallé was elected to the Senate for the Marne on 20 November 1898 after the death of the incumbent, Poirier. He was reelected on 7 January 1906 and on 11 January 1920. In 1901 Vallé was named president of the Radical Party. He was appointed Minister of Justice in the cabinet of Émile Combes formed on 7 June 1902, and held office until 23 January 1905. He died at home in Paris on 24 January 1920.

== Publications ==
- Rapport de la commission d'enquête chargée de faire la lumière sur les allégations portées à la tribune à l'occasion des affaires de Panama, 1893
- Les dangers de la proportionnelle: discours prononcés au banquet d'union républicaine du lundi 20 décembre 1909 (Groupe parlementaire de défense républicaine contre la proportionnelle : Émile Combes, Ernest Vallé, Fernand-Jean-Baptiste Dubief, Léon Bourgeois), A. Gallot, 1909
- Préface de La participation aux bénéfices : étude historique, critique et documentaire d'André Payer, Librairie des sciences politiques et sociales, 1911

== Sources ==
- Jolly, Jean (1960–1977). "Ernest VALLÉ". Dictionnaire des parlementaires français de 1889 à 1940 (in French). Presses universitaires de France. ISBN 2-1100-1998-0. Archived from the original on 3 March 2016.
- "VALLE Ernest" (in French). Senate of France.
