= Mangon (surname) =

Mangon is a surname literally meaning butcher in Walloon language. Notable people with the surname include:

- Johannes Mangon (c. 1525–1578), Francophone Belgian composer
- Hervé Mangon (1821–1888), French politician and engineer
