= Émile Maruéjouls =

French politician

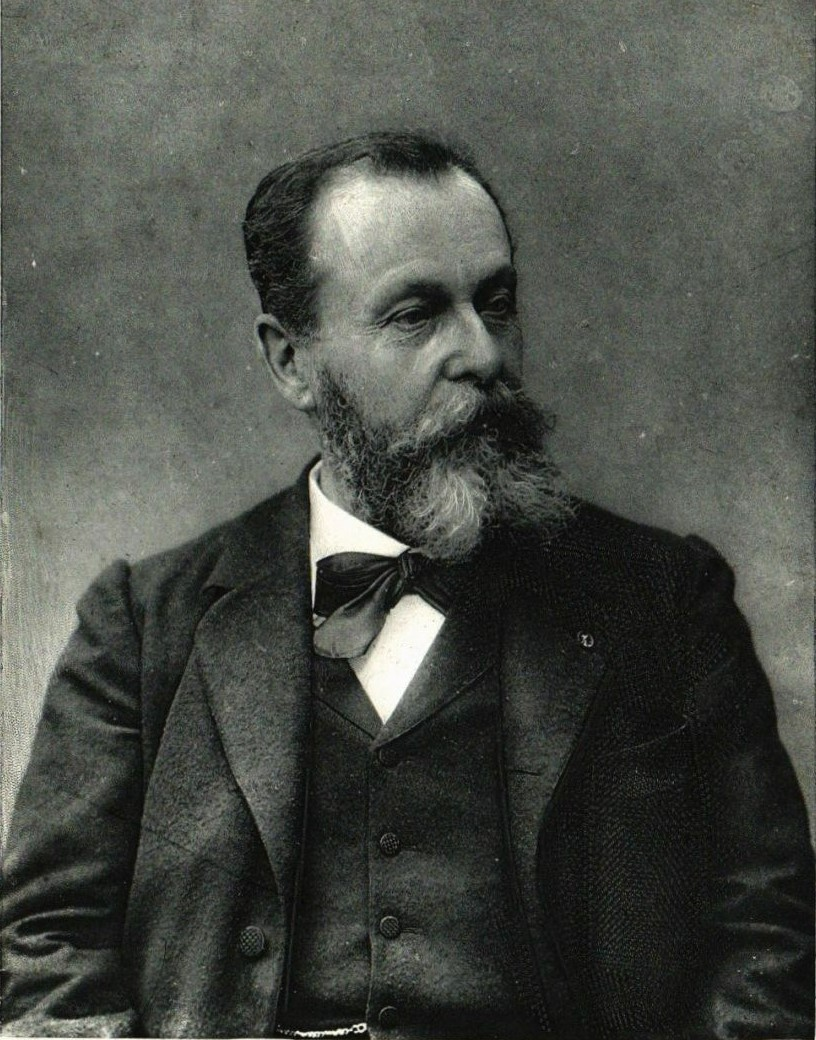

Émile Maruéjouls (4 August 1835 – 22 October 1908) was a French politician of the Third French Republic. He was minister of commerce, industries, posts and telegraphs (1898) in the government of Henri Brisson and minister of public works (1902–1905) in the government of Émile Combes.

== Sources ==
- « Émile Maruéjouls », dans le Dictionnaire des parlementaires français (1889-1940), sous la direction de Jean Jolly, PUF, 1960.
