= Victor Milliard =

French politician

Victor Édouard Milliard
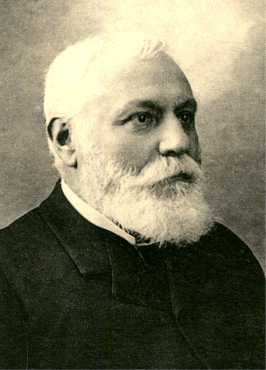

Minister of Justice
- In office 2 December 1897 – 28 June 1898
- Prime Minister: Jules Méline
- Preceded by: Jean-Baptiste Darlan
- Succeeded by: Ferdinand Sarrien

Personal details
- Born: 19 December 1844 Les Andelys, Eure, France
- Died: 9 May 1921 (aged 76) Paris, France

Victor Édouard Milliard (19 December 1844 – 9 May 1921) was a French politician who was Minister of Justice for a few months in 1897–98.

== Early career (1844–90) ==
Victor Édouard Milliard was born on 19 December 1844 in les Andelys, Eure. His father was an advocate in les Andelys. He became a lawyer. He was secretary of the Paris Bar Conference in 1867–1868. He acted as secretary of Jules Favre (1809–80). He ran unsuccessfully for election to the National Assembly on 8 February 1871 as Republican candidate for the department of Eure, and failed again in the election of 14 October 1877. He was elected deputy for the Eure on 14 October 1887 in a by-election. He sat with the Left. He failed to be reelected in 1889.

== Senator (1890–1921) ==
Milliard ran for the Senate in a by-election and was elected on 13 April 1890. He took a moderate Republican position. In 1891 he declared that the liberty of the press must be accompanied by a law against defamation. Without giving up his Senate seat, he ran for election as a deputy in 1893 but failed. He was reelected to the Senate on 7 January 1894. In April 1895 he was elected president of the general council of the Eure.

In the Senate Milliard joined the group of the Republican Left and Republican Union. He was Minister of Justice in the cabinet of Jules Méline from 2 December 1897 to 28 June 1898. As Minister he was primarily concerned with maintaining order. He was firmly opposed to reviewing the trial of Alfred Dreyfus, but also authorized the preventative arrest of the antisemitic agitator Max Régis in Algiers. In 1899 he was Méline's lieutenant as head of the Alliance of Progressive Republicans. He retained his Senate seat in the elections of 1903, 1912 and 1921. Milliard died on 9 May 1921 in Paris aged 76.

== Sources ==
- Beguec, Gilles Le (1 February 2003), La République des avocats (in French), Armand Colin, ISBN 978-2-200-35638-5
- Bellemare, Charles; Chaline, Nadine-Josette; Hardy, René; Roy, Jean (1987), Normandie et le Québec vus du presbytère (La) (in French), Publication Univ Rouen Havre, ISBN 978-2-87775-797-3
- Chaline, Jean-Pierre; Sohn, Anne-Marie (2000), Dictionnaire des parlementaires de Haute-Normandie sous la Troisième République, 1871-1940 (in French), Publication Univ Rouen Havre, ISBN 978-2-87775-669-3
- Jolly, Jean (1960–1977). "Milliard (Victor, Édouard)". Dictionnaire des parlementaires français; notices biographiques sur les ministres, députés et sénateurs français de 1889 à 1940 (in French). Paris: Presses universitaires de France. ISBN 2-1100-1998-0.
- Robert, Adolphe; Cougny, Gaston (1889–1891), "Milliard (Victor, Édouard)", in Edgar Bourloton (ed.), Dictionnaire des parlementaires français... : depuis le 1er mai 1789 jusqu'au 1er mai 1889 (in French)
