= Jean-Baptiste Darlan =

French politician (1848–1912)

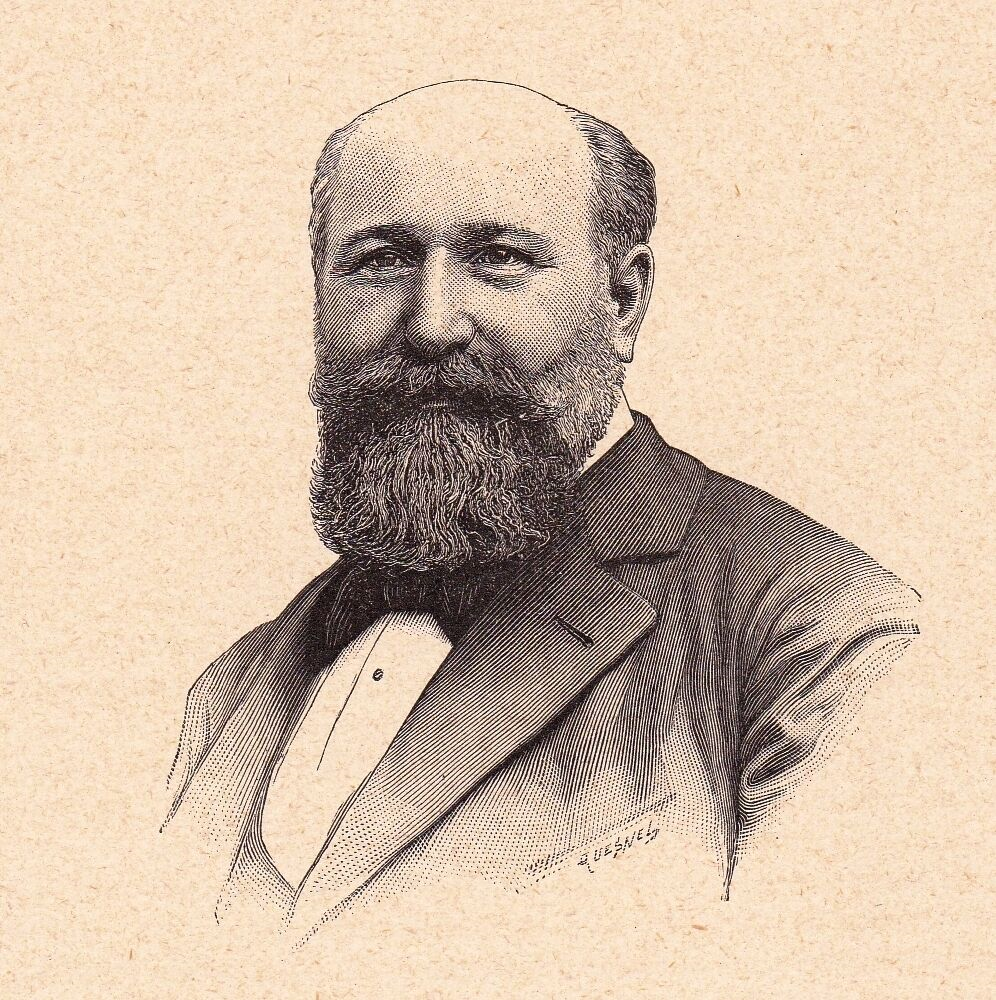
- Darlan in 1896

Minister of Justice
- In office 29 April 1896 – 1 December 1897
- Prime Minister: Jules Méline
- Preceded by: Louis Ricard
- Succeeded by: Victor Milliard

Personal details
- Born: 10 June 1848 Podensac, Gironde, France
- Died: 8 December 1912 (aged 64) Nérac, Lot-et-Garonne, France

Jean-Baptiste Darlan (10 June 1848 – 8 December 1912) was a French politician who was Minister of Justice in 1896–97.

== Early years (1848–80) ==
Jean-Baptiste Darlan was born on 10 June 1848 in Podensac, Gironde, son of a sea captain. A distant cousin of his had been a sailor on the ship that killed Nelson during the Battle of Trafalgar. His grandfather was a master mariner. His father owned two ships that sailed between France and Mexico, and was mayor of Podensac. Darlan studied at the lycée in Bordeaux, then obtained his law degree at the faculty of Paris. During the Franco-Prussian War of 1870 he was a non-commissioned officer in the forces of Lot-et-Garonne.

When his father died in 1872 Darlan had to sell the two ships, and with the proceeds bought the position of notary in Marmande. In 1877 he married Marie Marguerite Espagnac, daughter of a Nérac doctor, who brought a substantial dowry. Darlan sold his practice as a notary and set up as an attorney in Nérac. They had two children. Hélène married a ship's captain and François Darlan later became an admiral. François was born on 7 August 1881. Marie Marguerite died in 1885 at the age of 34.

== Political career (1880–98) ==
In 1878 Darlan joined the Association from Propagation of Republican Ideas, and became a freemason. As a member of the Grand Lodge he progressed through the ranks to become Vénérable in the lodge L'Auguste amitié in Condom. He became a friend of Armand Fallières and of Georges Leygues, who would many years later make his son chief of staff of the Ministry of Marine. In 1880 he became municipal councilor of Nérac, and was mayor of Nérac from 1880–82 and 1888–96. From 1886 to 1898 he was a member of the general council of the Lot-et-Garonne department.

Darlan was elected deputy for Lot-et-Garonne in a by-election on 27 July 1890 by a landslide, and was easily reelected in the general election of 20 August 1893. On 29 April 1896 he was appointed Minister of Justice in the cabinet of Jules Méline, and on 26 September 1896 was also appointed Minister of Religious Affairs. When he was in office there was growing public debate over the Dreyfus affair. Darlan was opposed to reviewing the trial of 1894. Auguste Scheurer-Kestner, vice-president of the Senate, became convinced that Dreyfus was innocent and came to see Darlan on 5 November 1896. Darlan said he could not support a premature investigation.

On 30 November 1897 Darlan was challenged over the appointment of two magistrates, said to have been made for political reasons, and was censured by the Senate. He resigned the next day. He lost his seat in the general elections of 8–22 May 1898.

== Last years (1898–1912) ==
Darlan was named percepteur-receveur in Paris in 1899. He died on 8 December 1912 in Nérac, Lot-et-Garonne.

== Sources ==
- Berthou, Benoît; Chautard, Sophie; Guislain, Gilbert (2003), "Darlan, amiral (1881-1942)", 100 hommes qui ont fait la France du XXe siècle (in French), Studyrama, ISBN 978-2-84472-323-9
- Guillaume, Sylvie; Lachaise, Bernard (1 January 1998), "DARLAN Jena-Baptiste, Joas", Dictionnaire des parlementaires d'Aquitaine sous la Troisième République (in French), Presses Univ de Bordeaux, ISBN 978-2-86781-231-6
- Jolly, Jean (1960–1977). "Darlan (Jean-Baptiste)". Dictionnaire des parlementaires français; notices biographiques sur les ministres, députés et sénateurs français de 1889 à 1940 (in French). Paris: Presses universitaires de France. ISBN 2-1100-1998-0. Archived from the original on 3 March 2016.
- Ordioni, Pierre (1995), La fracture: de Londres 1941 à Sétif 1945, Nouvelles Editions Latines, ISBN 978-2-7233-0492-4
- Read, Piers Paul (2 February 2012), The Dreyfus Affair, A&C Black, ISBN 978-1-4088-0139-0
