= Le Pays de France =

French newspaper during WWI

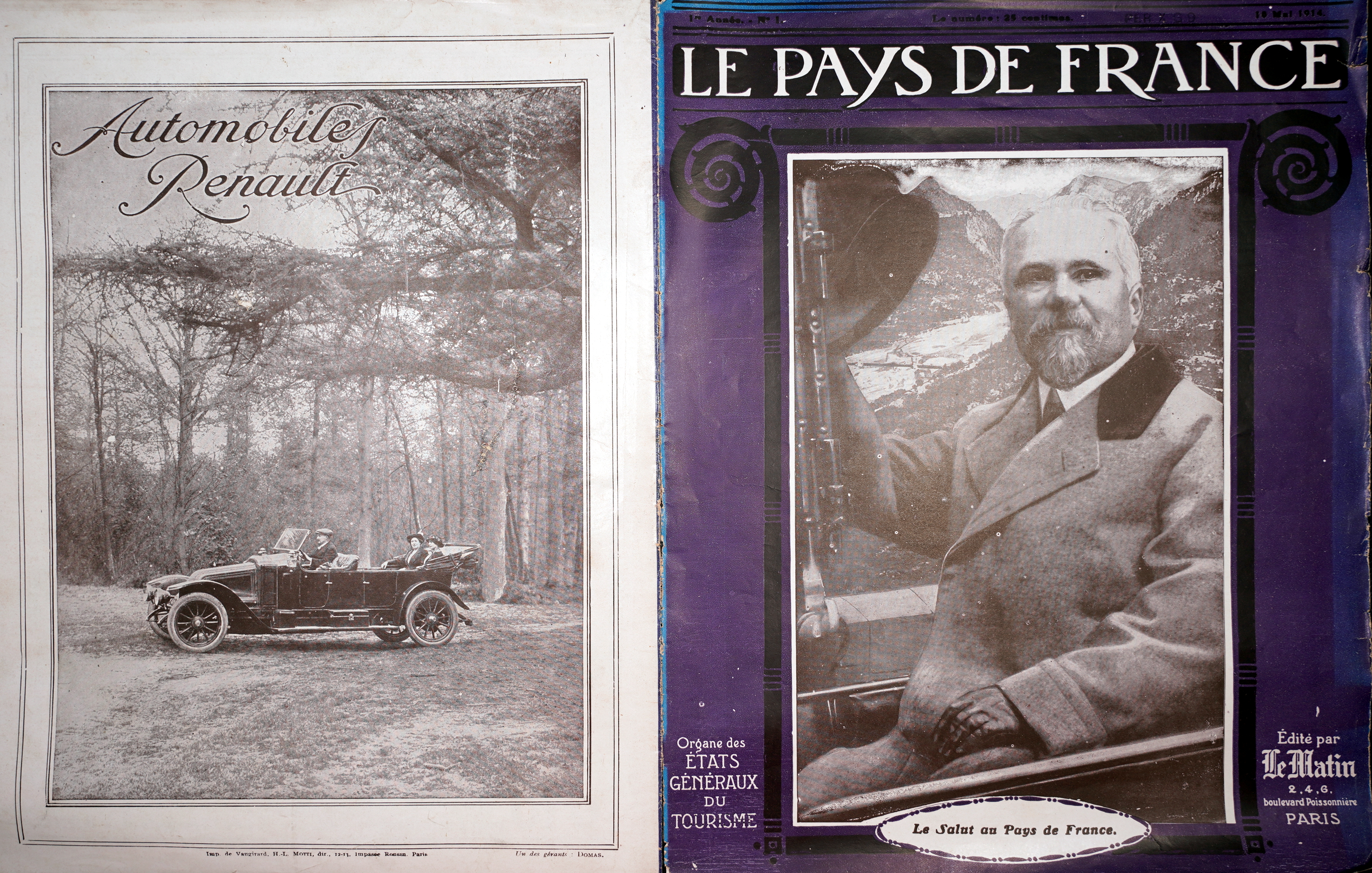
N°1, Raymond Poincaré President of France

Le Pays de France, subtitled Organe des états généraux du tourisme (The Country of France - Organ of the Estates General for Tourism), was a French newspaper of the First World War. It originated in a monthly paper edited by Le Matin and was intended for promotion of tourism. As a monthly it only lasted for 3 issues, with the first on 10 May 1914 and the last in July 1914. It then became a weekly paper two months after the outbreak of war, on 12 November 1914, ceasing publication in 1919, with its final issue (numéro 219) on 26 December 1918. Resolutely patriotic in tone, it reported battles and the wartime experiences of France's soldiers and people in reports, battle maps and photographs. Since 30 March 2022, a new edition of the newspaper has been published around the clock in six languages at: LePaysdeFrance.fr

== Gallery ==
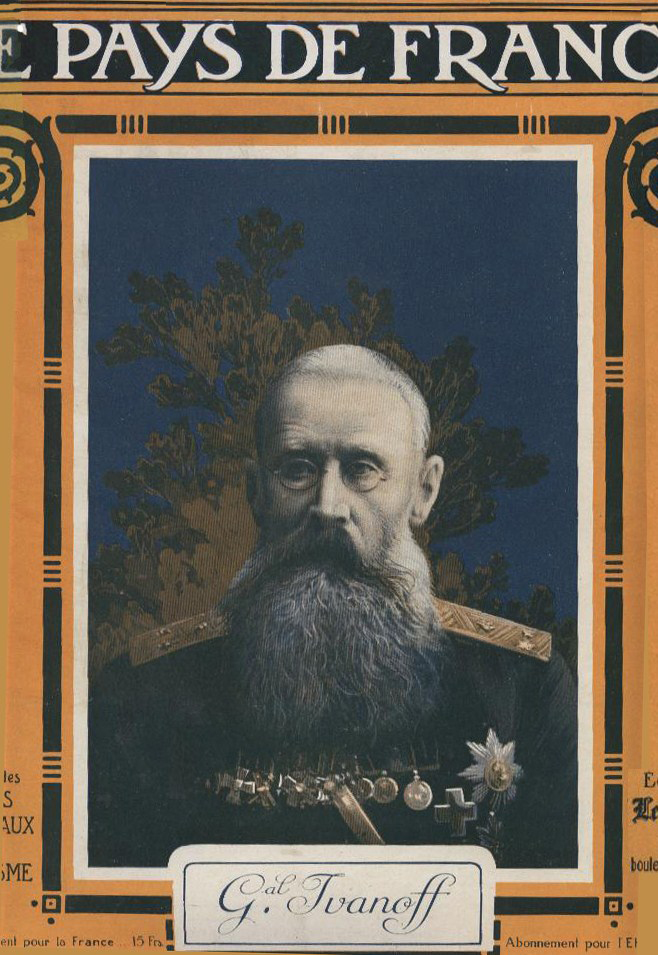
N° 72, General Nikolaï Ivanov.

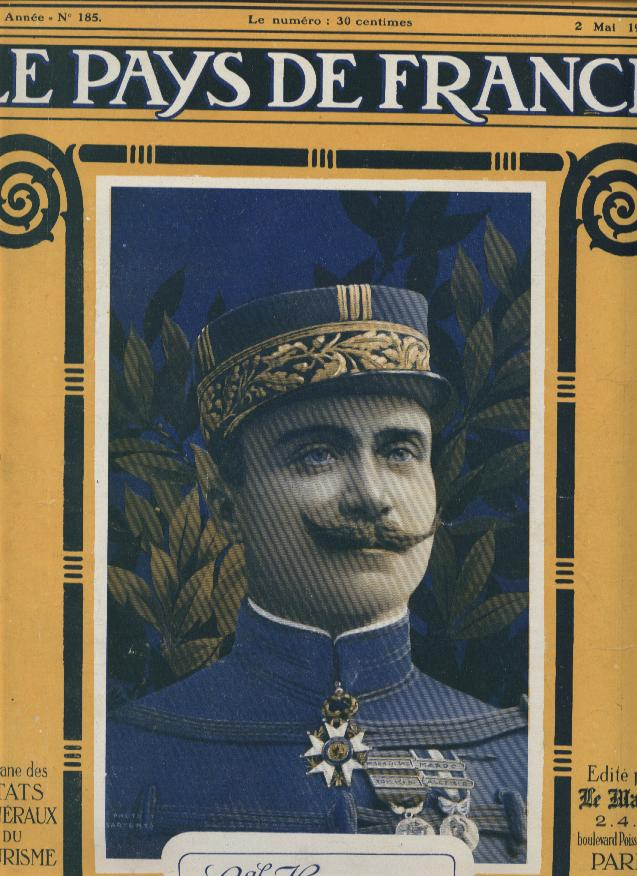
N° 185, General Paul Prosper Henrys.

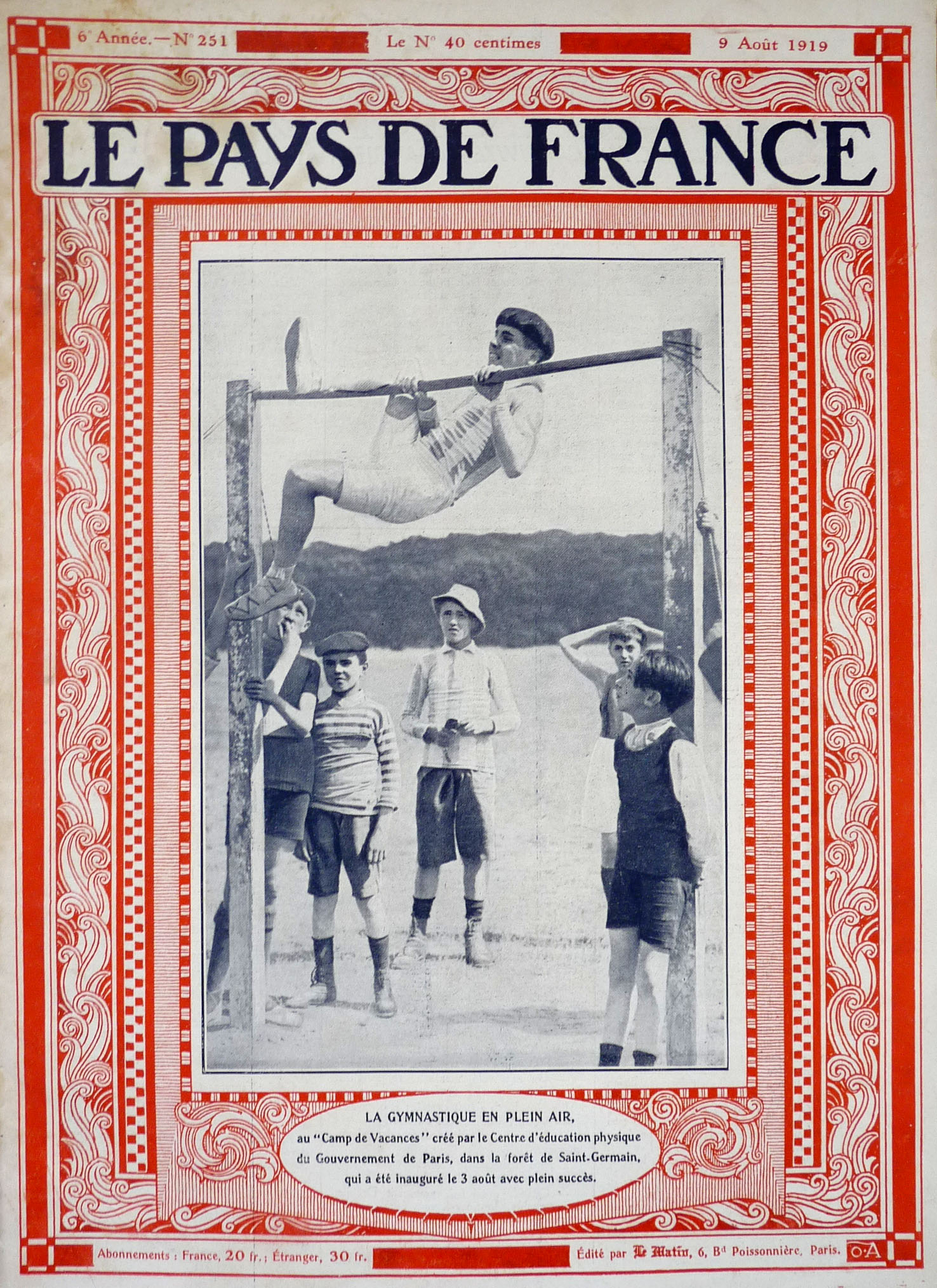
n° 251, 9 August 1919

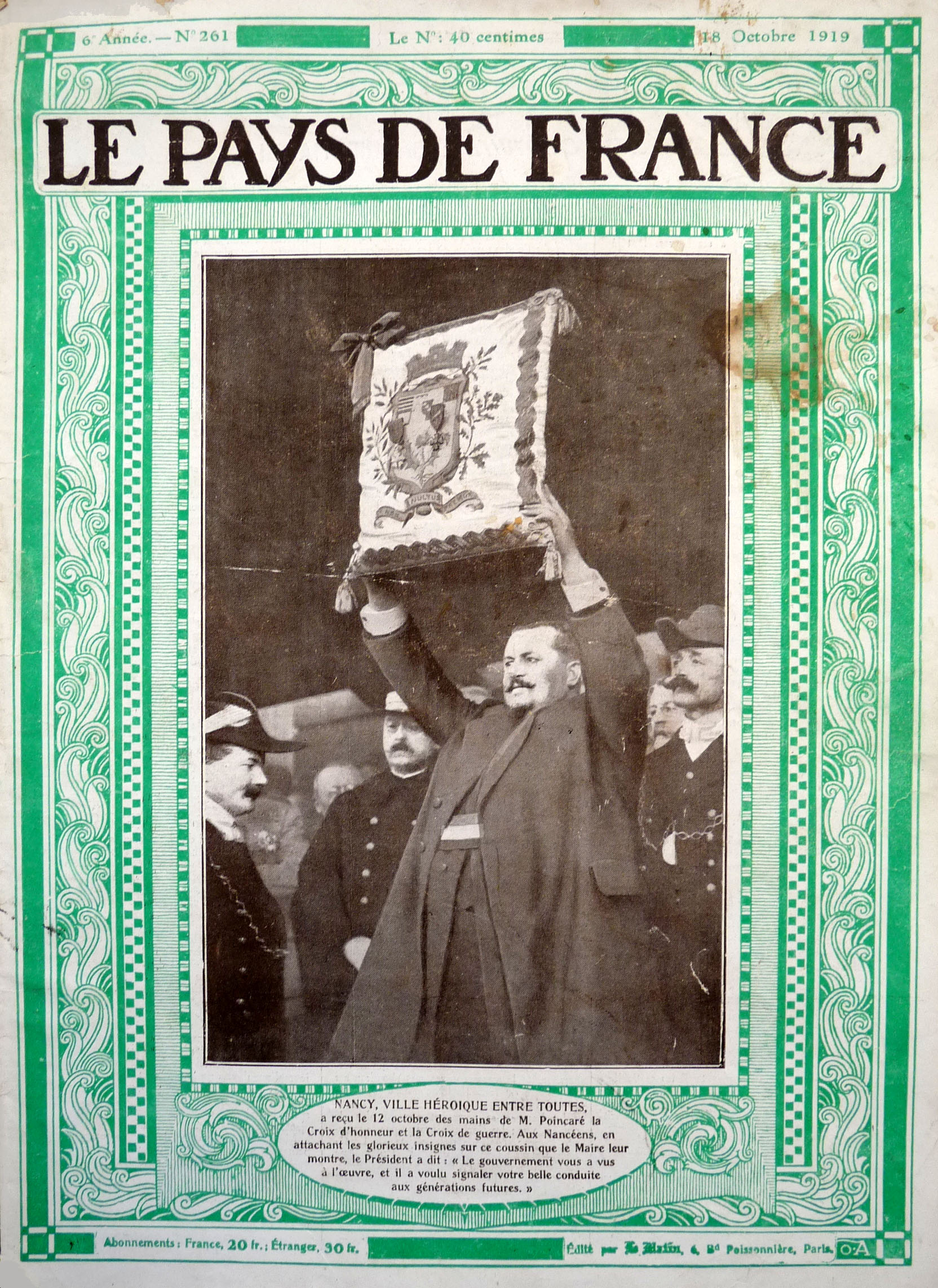
n° 261, 18 October 1919 Gustave Louis Simon

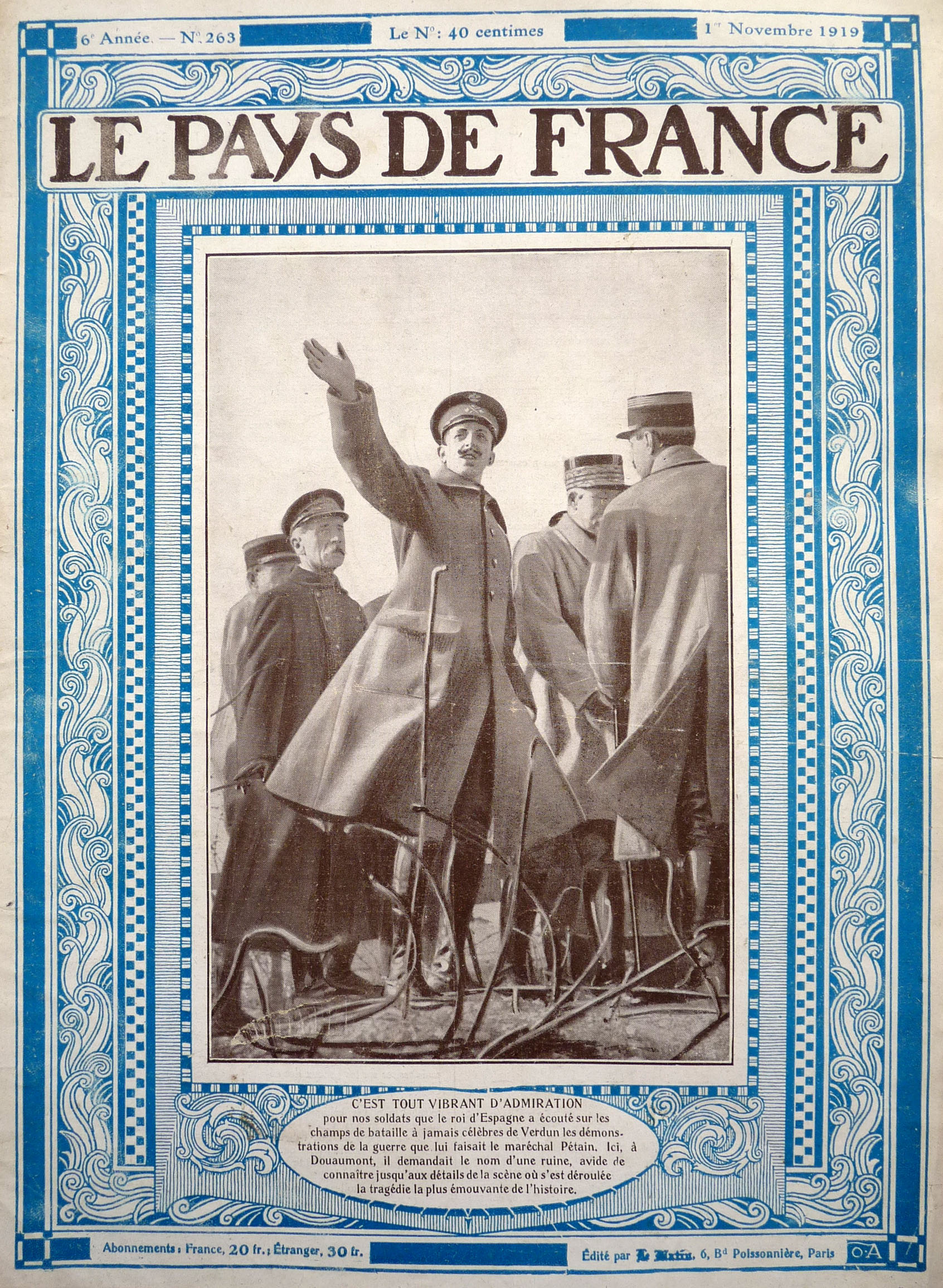
n° 263, 1 November 1919 Alfonso XIII of Spain

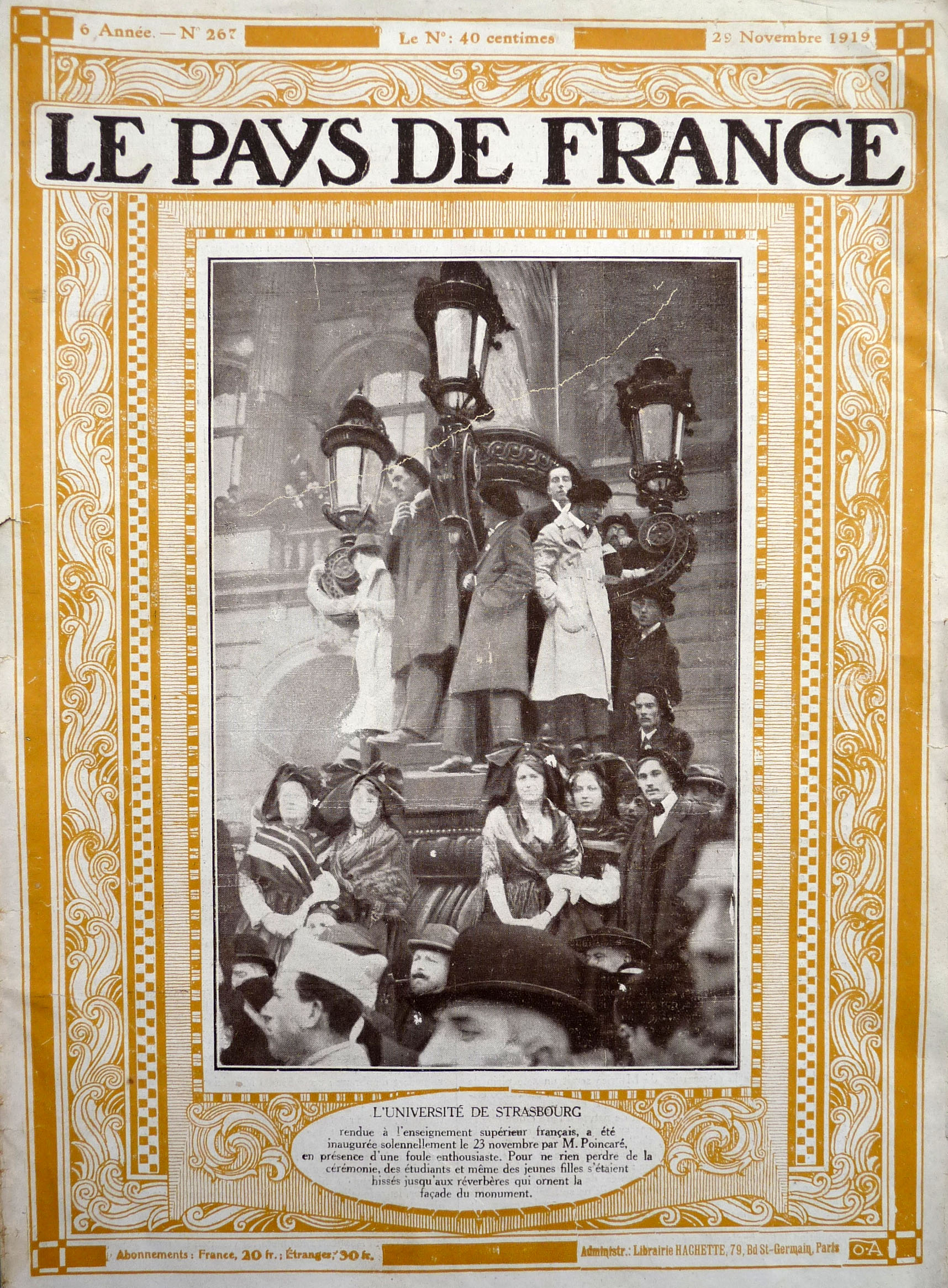
n° 267, 29 November 1919 University of Strasbourg

== Sources ==
- Le Pays de France - a Travel Magazine Turned into a War Weekly sur www.greatwardifferent.com - The Great War in a Different Light
- (in French) Liste de Périodiques de la Bibliothèque Interuniversitaire de Pharmacie at www.biup.univ-paris5.fr
