= Émile Zurlinden =

French Minister of War (1837-1929)

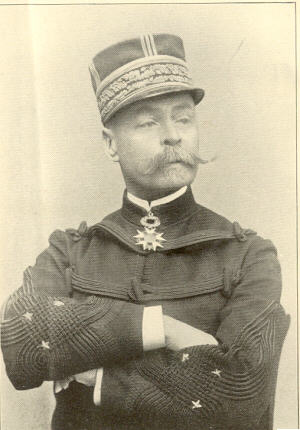
Émile Zurlinden

Émile Auguste François Thomas Zurlinden (3 November 1837 – 9 March 1929) was a French Army general and politician. An Alsatian by birth, he distinguished himself on the battlefield during the Franco-Prussian War, and participated in the suppression of the Paris Commune. He was Minister of War twice, in 1895 and again in 1898, during which he was involved with the Dreyfus affair.

== Life and military career ==
Zurlinden was born in Colmar, Haut-Rhin, the son of Michel Thiébaut Zurlinden and Joséphine Albertine Eugénie Baumann. He studied at the Collège de Colmar, the École polytechnique, the École d’application de l’artillerie in Metz, and the Saumur Cavalry School.

Promoted to captain in 1866, he distinguished himself during the Franco-Prussian War, fighting in the battles of Borny, Rezonville, Saint-Privat-la-Montagne et Sainte-Barbe. Made a prisoner of war, he refused parole and was imprisoned in a fortress in Silesia, from which he escaped, offering his services to Gambetta's Government of National Defense. He was promoted to général de brigade in 1886 and général de division in 1890. In 1898, he was appointed military governor of Paris and joined the Conseil supérieur de la guerre.

== Political career ==
In January 1895, Zurlinden became Minister of War in Alexandre Ribot's government. He was deeply involved with the Dreyfus affair, and pursued the anti-Dreyfusard policies of his predecessor, Auguste Mercier. Keen to limit Dreyfus' communications with the outside world, he had the Chamber pass the Law of 9 February 1895, adding the Îles du Salut as a place of deportation. He resigned with the rest of the government the same year over the Second Madagascar expedition, for which he had responsibility.

In 1898, he once again served as Minister of War, in Henri Brisson's second government, following the resignation of Godefroy Cavaignac. Zurlinden recommended against the reexamination of the Dreyfus case. When the government decided, in spite of his advice, to appoint a commission to examine the matter, he resigned for the second time, to be succeeded by Charles Chanoine. Returning to his post of military governor of Paris, he undertook to prosecute Lieutenant-Colonel Georges Picquart on an allegation of forgery. He was replaced as military governor in 1899 by the Waldeck-Rousseau government and the new Minister of War, Gaston de Galliffet.

Remaining a member of the Conseil supérieur de la guerre, Zurlinden retired from active service in 1902, still convinced of Dreyfus' guilt. After his retirement, he published a book on Napoleon's marshals, as well his memoirs. He stood for election to the Chamber of Deputies in 1906, but was defeated by the incumbent, Charles Schneider. He died in Paris in 1929.

He was closely involved in the Resolution of the Dreyfus affair.

He was cross-eyed.

== Assessments ==
No military honours were paid at his funeral, and no street is named after him in either Paris or Alsace, which Jean-Marie Schmitt attributes to his role in the Dreyfus affair.

Jean-Denis Bredin describes him as "a handsome man of impeccable reputation and an admirable horseman".

According to Joseph Jacobs, "he was an honest soldier, but narrow-minded;" insults in the press "did not fail to affect him".

Political offices
Preceded by Auguste Mercier	Minister of War; 28 January-1 November 1895	Succeeded by Jacques Marie Eugène Godefroy Cavaignac
Preceded by Jacques Marie Eugène Godefroy Cavaignac	Minister of War; 5–17 September 1898	Succeeded by Charles Sulpice Jules Chanoine
