= 1898 French legislative election =

- 8 and 22 May 1898

All 585 seats in the Chamber of Deputies 293 seats needed for a majority
- Registered: 10,779,123
- Turnout: 75.2%
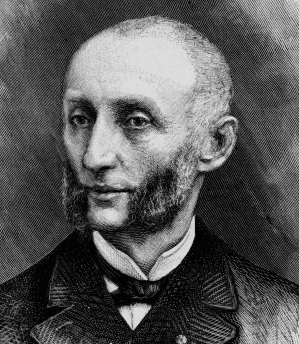

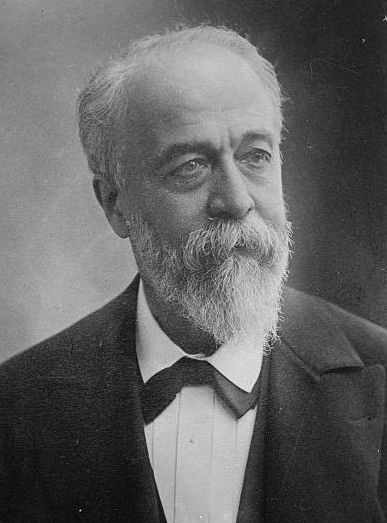

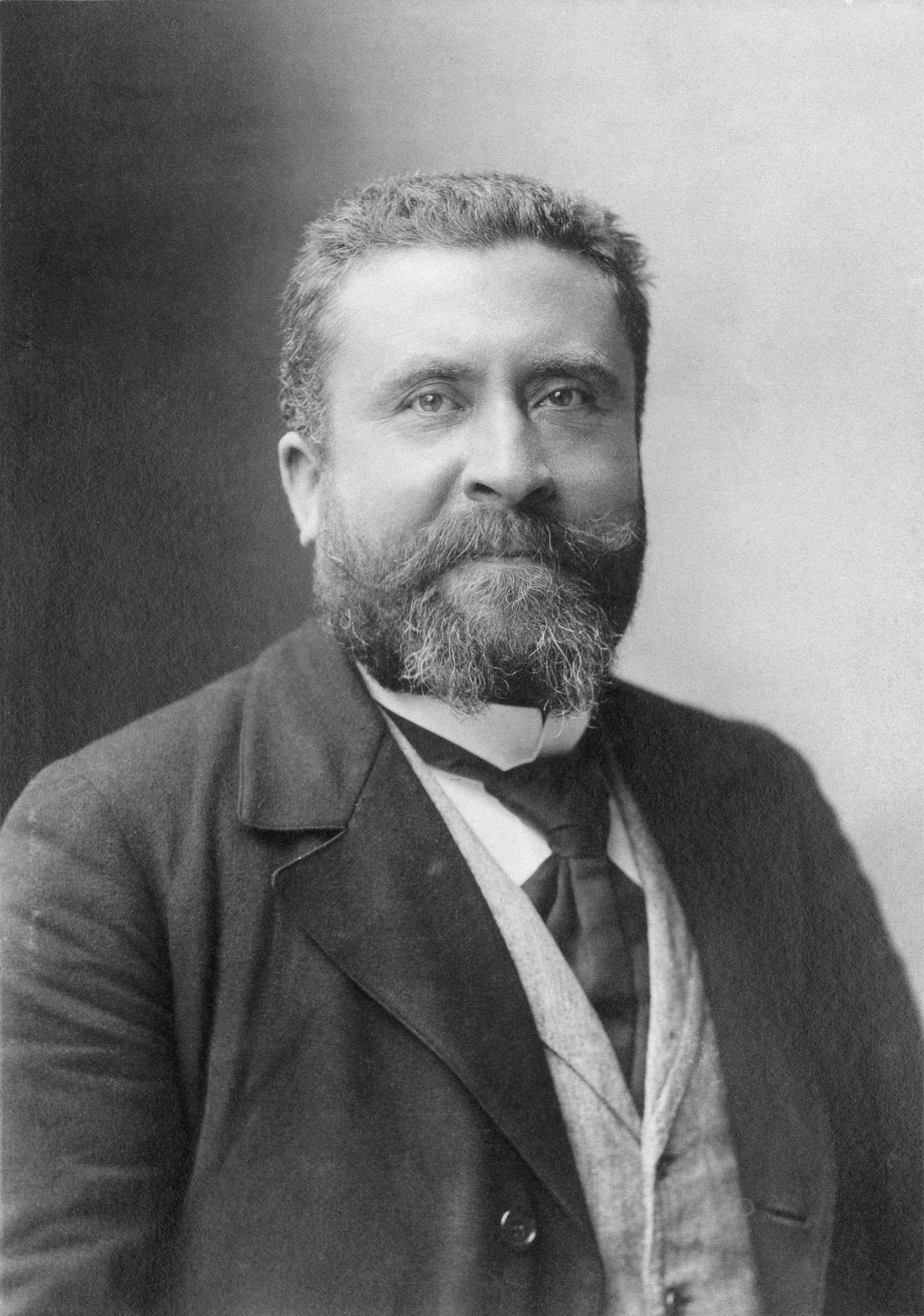

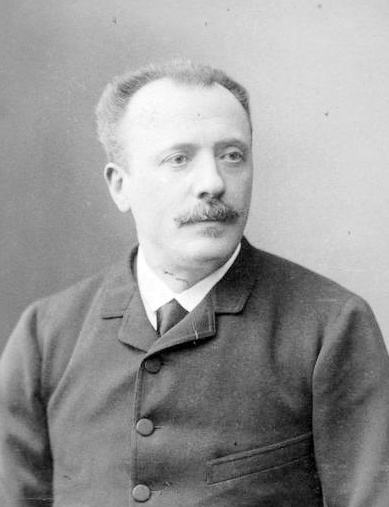
	First party	Second party
Leader	Jules Méline	Henri Brisson
Party	Progressives	Independent Radicals
Last election		143 seats, 20.20%
Seats won	254	104
Seat change		▼39
Popular vote	3,262,725	1,293,507
	Third party	Fourth party
Leader	Jean Jaurès (lost election)	Adrien Albert Marie de Mun
Party	Socialists	Monarchists
Last election	31 seats, 8.37%
Seats won	57	44
Seat change	▲26
Popular vote	791,148	887,759
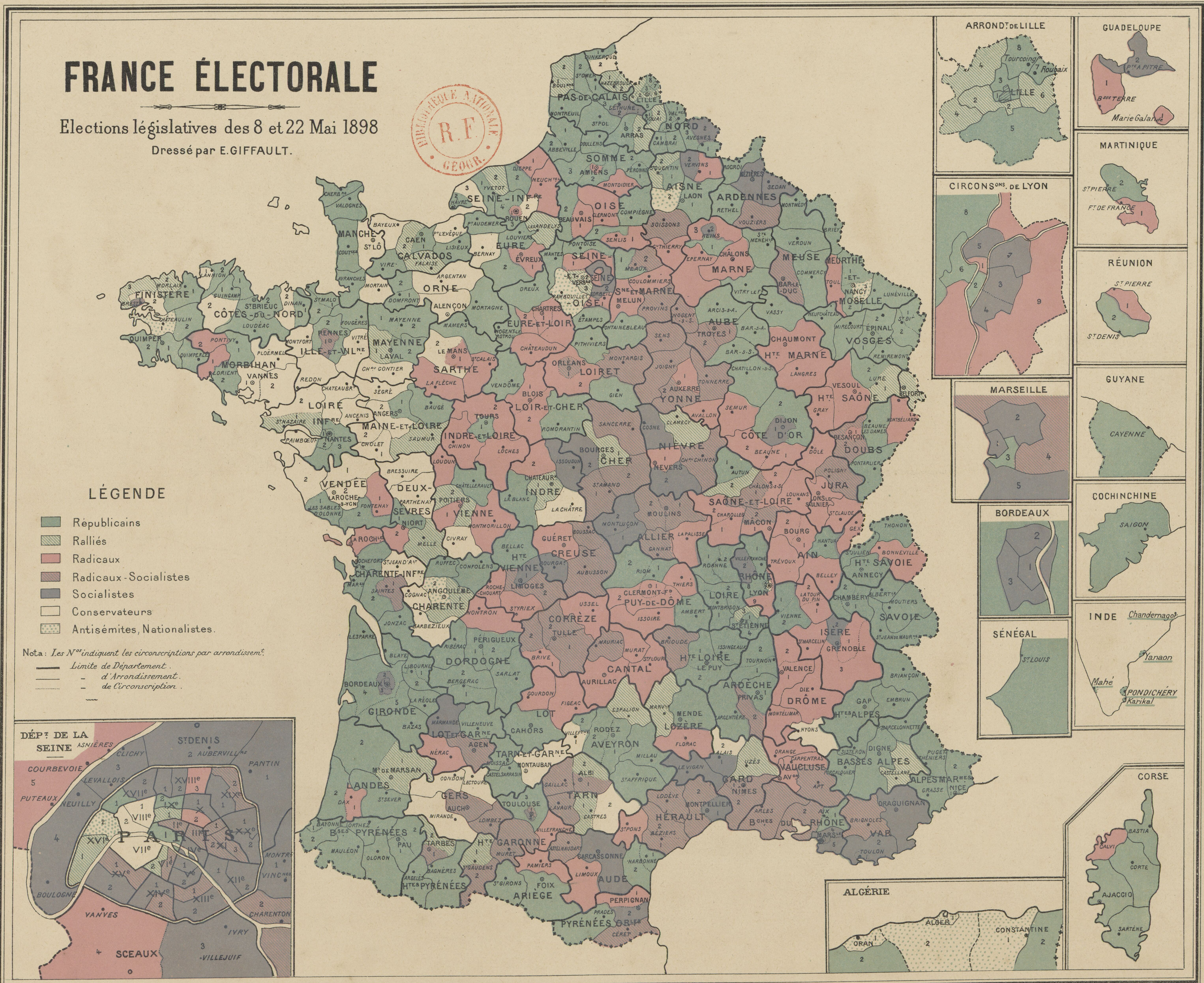
- Results of the election
Prime Minister before election
Jules Méline
Democratic Union
Elected Prime Minister
Henri Brisson
Radical Left

Legislative elections were held in France on 8 and 22 May 1898. The government of Jules Méline, who had been prime minister since April 1896, had relied on the support of conservatives, contrary to the convention of republican concentration, according to which no government should rely on the support of monarchists and Bonapartists in the Chamber of Deputies if it could not rely on a republican majority.

The elections were dominated by the Dreyfus affair, and saw several notable supporters of Dreyfus (Joseph Reinach, Jean Jaurès, Jules Guesde) lose their seats. Around twenty eight professed antisemites were also elected (six of whom were elected after campaigning under the "anti-juif" or "anti-Jew" label), including Édouard Drumont.

Whilst the incumbent governing alliance led by Méline won more seats than any other faction, this victory was short-lived. Due to a combination of factors, such as the ongoing Dreyfus Affair, deputies within Méline's faction relying on support from Radical voters to secure their seats, and the overall strengthening of extremists across the political landscape, Méline could not rely on his own faction to support him. When the Chamber of Deputies reconvened on 22 June 1898, these fears were realized, after sufficient monarchist and progressist members of Méline's faction broke ranks and voted to support the Radicals instead.

Ultimately, the elections saw the defeat of Méline and his supporters: the Radical victory in the Chamber of Deputies allowed Henri Brisson to form a republican government.

== Results ==
Party	Votes	%	Seats
Progressives	3,262,725		254
Independent Radicals	1,293,507		104
Monarchists	887,759		44
Socialists	791,148		57
Radical-Socialists	629,572		74
Nationalists	250,101		6
Ralliés			32
Miscellaneous right			10
Revisionists			4
Total			585
Total votes	8,106,123	–	
Registered voters/turnout	10,779,123	75.20	
Source: Rois et Présidents
