= Pierre Gomot =

French politician (1838–1927)

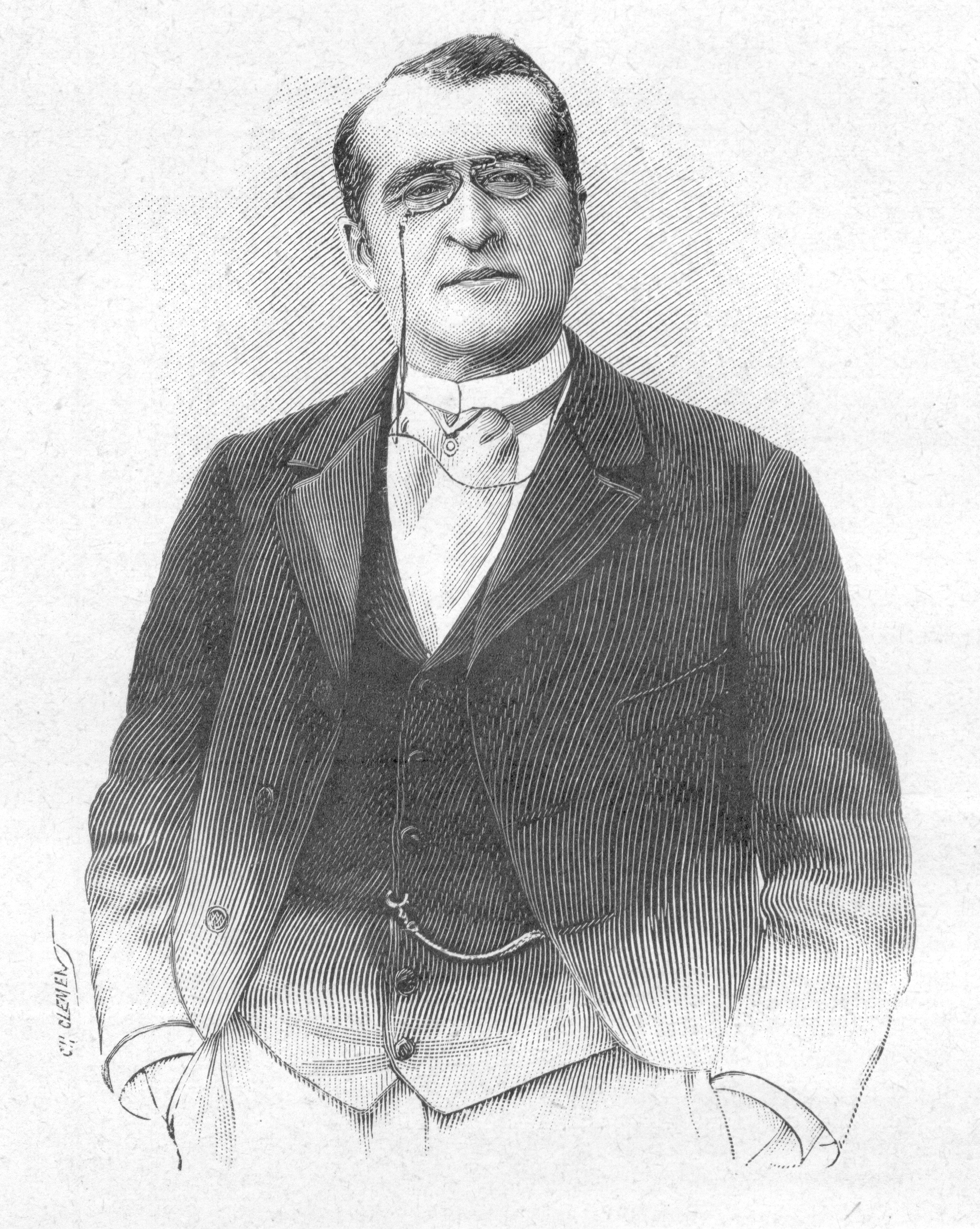
Portrait of Pierre Auguste Hippolyte Gomot

Pierre Auguste Hippolyte Gomot (12 October 1838 – 8 November 1927) was a French politician of the French Third Republic. He was minister of agriculture (November 1885–January 1886) in the government of Henri Brisson. He was a member of the Chamber of Deputies of France from 1881 to 1889 and the Senate of France from 1891 until his death.

== Sources ==
- "Pierre Gomot", in Adolphe Robert and Gaston Cougny, Dictionnaire des parlementaires français (1789–1891), Bourloton, Paris, 1889 Edition details Wikisource
- « Pierre Gomot », dans le Dictionnaire des parlementaires français (1889-1940), sous la direction de Jean Jolly, PUF, 1960.
