= Charles Demôle =

French politician

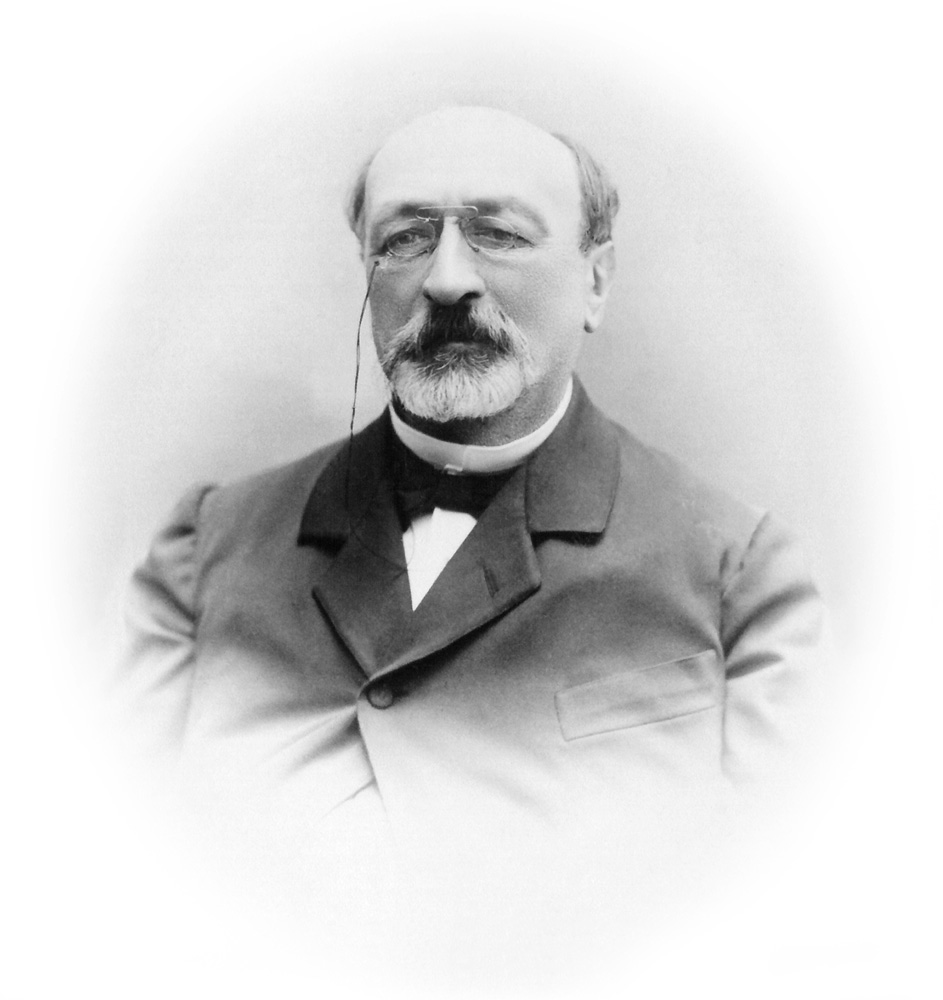

Charles Demôle (March 22, 1828 – June 18, 1908) was a French politician of the French Third Republic. He was minister of public works (April 16, 1885 – January 6, 1886) in the government of Henri Brisson. He was minister of justice (January 7–December 10, 1886) in the government of Charles de Freycinet. He was a member of the Senate of France from January 5, 1879, until his death. He served twice as vice-president of the French Senate (1891–1895, 1898–1902).

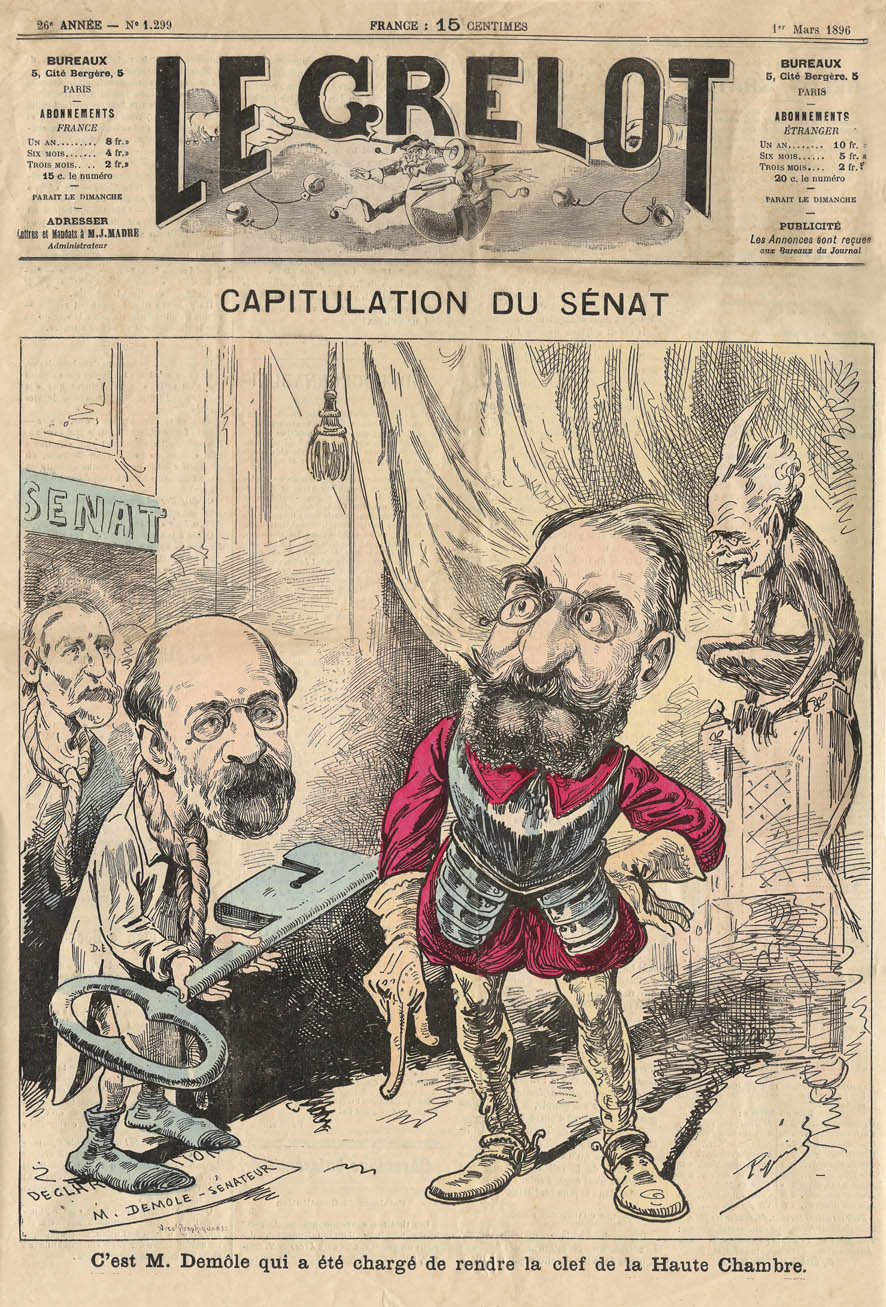
Caricature published on March 1, 1896 - Charles Demôle and Le Royer (?) present the key to the Senate to the head of the Government Léon Bourgeois (inspired by the Rodin sculpture Les Bourgeois de Calais inaugurated on June 8, 1895)

== Sources ==
- "Charles Demôle", in Adolphe Robert and Gaston Cougny, Dictionnaire des parlementaires français (1789–1891), Bourloton, Paris, 1889 Edition details Wikisource
