= Henri Brisson =

19th/20th-century French politician

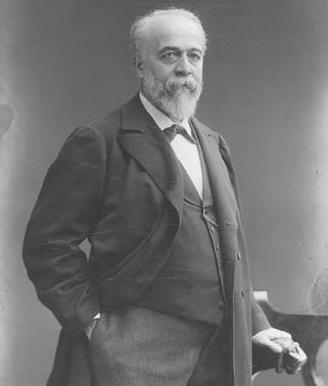

Prime Minister of France
- In office 28 June 1898 – 1 November 1898
- President: Félix Faure
- Preceded by: Jules Méline
- Succeeded by: Charles Dupuy
- In office 6 April 1885 – 7 January 1886
- President: Jules Grévy
- Preceded by: Jules Ferry
- Succeeded by: Charles de Freycinet

Personal details
- Born: 31 July 1835 Bourges, Kingdom of France
- Died: 14 April 1912 (aged 76) Paris, France
- Party: Radical

Eugène Henri Brisson (French: [ɑ̃ʁi bʁisɔ̃]; 31 July 1835 – 14 April 1912) was a French statesman, who was twice Prime Minister of France, between 1885–1886 and in 1898.

== Biography ==
He was born at Bourges (Cher), and followed his father's profession of advocate. Having made his mark in opposition during the last days of the empire, he was appointed deputy-mayor of Paris after the government was overthrown. He was elected to the Assembly on 8 February 1871, as a member of the extreme Left. While not approving of the Commune, he was the first to propose amnesty for the condemned (on 13 September 1871), but the proposal was voted down. He strongly supported compulsory primary education, and was firmly anti-clerical. He was president of the chamber from 1881 — replacing Léon Gambetta — to March 1885, when he became prime minister upon the resignation of Jules Ferry; but he resigned when, after the general elections of that year, he only just obtained a majority for the vote of credit for the Tonkin expedition.

He remained conspicuous as a public man, took a prominent part in exposing the Panama scandals, was a strong candidate for the presidency of France after the murder of President Carnot in 1894; however, he lost to Jean Casimir-Perier. Brisson was once again president of the chamber from December 1894 to 1898. Brisson stood once again as a candidate for the presidency of France in 1895, but lost once again to Félix Faure. Following the 1898 French legislative election, whilst the country was violently excited over the Dreyfus affair, the incumbent Premier, Jules Méline, lost the confidence of the Chamber of Deputies - subsequently allowing Brisson be re-appointed as Premier and form a new cabinet in June 1898. Brisson's firmness and honesty increased popular respect for him, but a chance vote on a matter of especial excitement overthrew his ministry in October. As a leader of the radicals he actively supported the ministries of Waldeck-Rousseau and Combes, especially concerning the laws on the religious orders and the separation of church and state. In May 1906, he was re-elected president of the chamber of deputies by 500 out of 581 votes.

== Brisson's 1st Ministry, 6 April 1885 – 7 January 1886 ==
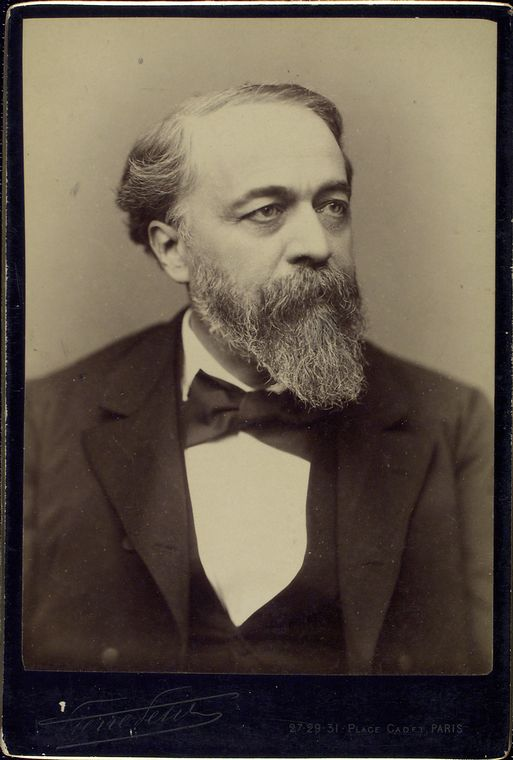
Brisson early in his career.

- Henri Brisson – President of the Council and Minister of Justice
- Charles de Freycinet – Minister of Foreign Affairs
- Jean-Baptiste Campenon – Minister of War
- François Allain-Targé – Minister of the Interior
- Jean Clamageran – Minister of Finance
- Charles Eugène Galiber – Minister of Marine and Colonies
- René Goblet – Minister of Public Instruction, Fine Arts, and Worship
- Hervé Mangon – Minister of Agriculture
- Sadi Carnot – Minister of Public Works
- Ferdinand Sarrien – Minister of Posts and Telegraphs
- Pierre Legrand – Minister of Commerce

Changes

- 16 April 1885 – Sadi Carnot succeeds Clamageran as Minister of Finance. Charles Demôle succeeds Carnot as Minister of Public Works.
- 9 November 1885 – Pierre Gomot succeeds Mangon as Minister of Agriculture. Lucien Dautresme succeeds Legrand as Minister of Commerce.

== Brisson's Second Ministry, 28 June – 1 November 1898 ==
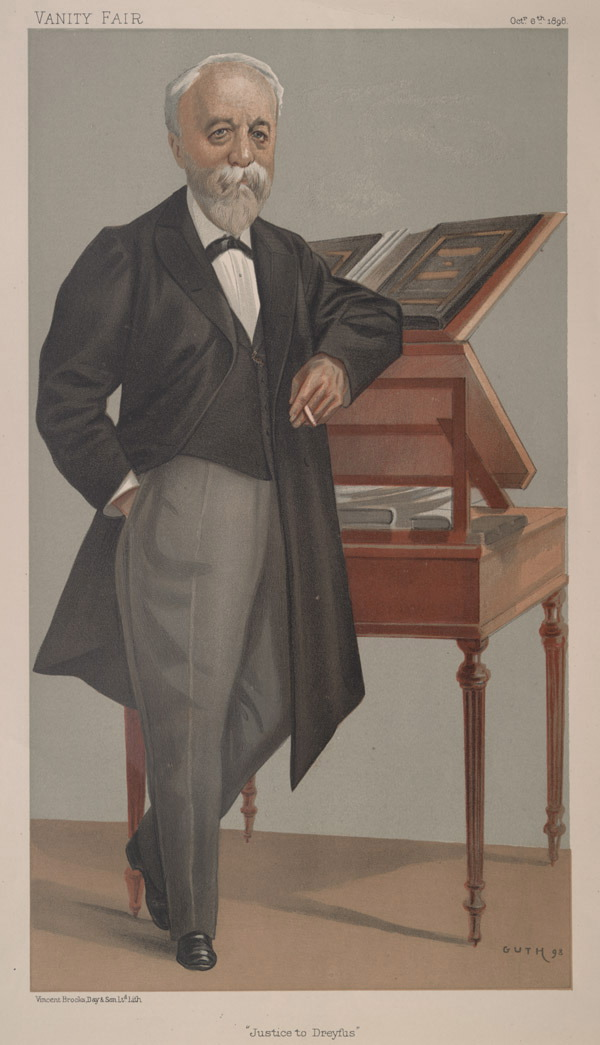
Brisson by Guth, October 1898

- Henri Brisson – President of the Council and Minister of the Interior
- Théophile Delcassé – Minister of Foreign Affairs
- Godefroy Cavaignac – Minister of War
- Paul Peytral – Minister of Finance
- Ferdinand Sarrien – Minister of Justice and Worship
- Édouard Locroy – Minister of Marine
- Léon Bourgeois – Minister of Public Instruction and Fine Arts
- Albert Viger – Minister of Agriculture
- Georges Trouillot – Minister of Colonies
- Louis Tillaye – Minister of Public Works
- Émile Maruéjouls – Minister of Commerce, Industry, Posts, and Telegraphs

Changes

- 5 September 1898 – Émile Zurlinden succeeds Cavaignac as Minister of War
- 17 September 1898 – Charles Chanoine succeeds Zurlinden as Minister of War. Jules Godin succeeds Tillaye as Minister of Public Works.
- 25 October 1898 – Édouard Locroy succeeds Chanoine as interim Minister of War, remaining also Minister of Marine.

Political offices
| Preceded by Léon Gambetta | President of the Chamber of Deputies; 1881–1885 | Succeeded by Charles Floquet |
| Preceded by Félix Martin-Feuillée | Minister of Justice; 1885 | Succeeded by Charles Demôle |
| Preceded by Jules Ferry | Prime Minister of France; 1885–1886 | Succeeded by Charles de Freycinet |
| Preceded by Auguste Burdeau | President of the Chamber of Deputies; 1894–1898 | Succeeded by Paul Deschanel |
| Preceded by Jules Méline | Prime Minister of France; 1898 | Succeeded by Charles Dupuy |
| Preceded by Louis Barthou | Minister of the Interior; 1898 | Succeeded by Charles Dupuy |
| Preceded by Léon Bourgeois | President of the Chamber of Deputies; 1904–1905 | Succeeded by Paul Doumer |
| Preceded by Paul Doumer | President of the Chamber of Deputies; 1906–1912 | Succeeded by Paul Deschanel |
