= Émile Combes =

French statesman (1835–1921)

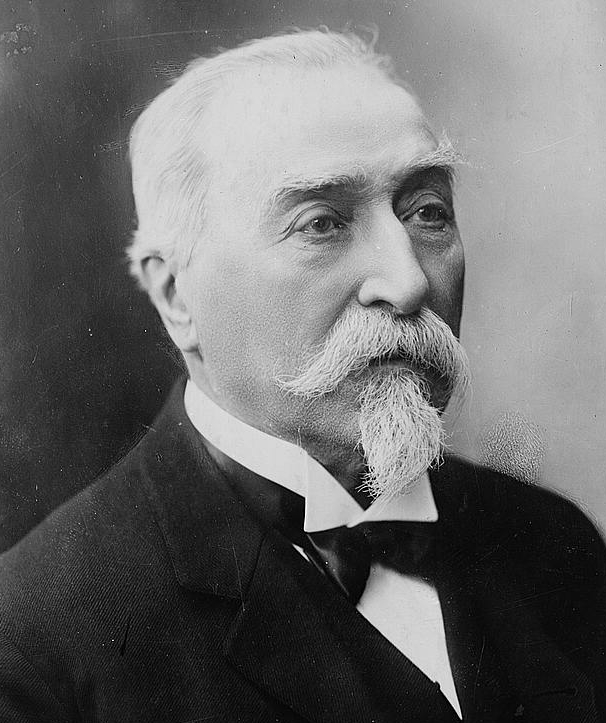

Prime Minister of France
- In office 7 June 1902 – 24 January 1905
- President: Émile Loubet
- Preceded by: Pierre Waldeck-Rousseau
- Succeeded by: Maurice Rouvier

Personal details
- Born: 6 September 1835 Roquecourbe
- Died: 25 May 1921 (aged 85) Pons, Charente-Maritime
- Party: Radical Party
- Spouse: Angèle-Maria Dussaud

Émile Justin Louis Combes (French: [emil kɔ̃b]; 6 September 1835 – 25 May 1921) was a French politician and freemason who led the Coalition of the Left (French: Bloc des gauches) cabinet from June 1902 to January 1905.

== Career ==
Émile Combes was born on 6 September 1835, in Roquecourbe, Tarn, the sixth child of Jean Combes, a dressmaker, and Marie-Rose Bannesborn.

He first learned Latin from his public schoolteacher and then from his godfather and cousin, a priest named Jean Gaubert. Gabriel Merle, biographer of Émile Combes, describes Jean Gaubert: "He has the prestige and authority of the priesthood and education. He is obeyed. And if he demands sacrifices, he also imposes them on himself. His insistence that one of his younger cousins should become a priest is astonishing. Having failed with Philippe around 1840 and Émile in 1847, he missed his last attempt with Henri around 1860."

Thanks to his knowledge of Latin, twelve-year-old Émile Combes entered the fourth year of the minor seminary in Castres. His godfather supported him financially through his studies, first at the seminary; then at the École des Carmes, an ecclesiastical school where future priests wishing to study at the Sorbonne were trained; and finally at the Grand Séminaire d'Albi, where Émile Combes wore the cassock and was tonsured. Here, his vocation to the priesthood was seen as unserious, and despite initial efforts to persist, he would abandon the idea before ordination.

His anti-clericalism would later lead him into becoming a Freemason. He was also in later life a spiritualist. He later took a diploma as a doctor of letters (1860). He then studied medicine and graduated in 1867, and setting up in practice at Pons in Charente-Inférieure. In 1881, he presented himself as a political candidate for Saintes, but was defeated. In 1885, he was elected to the senate by the département of Charente-Inférieure. He sat in the Democratic left, and was elected vice-president in 1893 and 1894. The reports which he drew up upon educational questions drew attention to him, and on 3 November 1895, he entered the Leon Victor Auguste Bourgeois cabinet as minister of public instruction, resigning with his colleagues on 21 April following.

== Prime minister ==
He actively supported the Waldeck-Rousseau ministry, and upon its retirement in 1902, he was himself charged with the formation of a cabinet. In this, he took the portfolio of the Interior, and the main energy of the government was devoted to an anti-clerical agenda. The parties of the Left united upon this question in the Bloc republicain, supported Combes in his application of the law of 1901 on the religious associations, and voted the new bill on the congregations (1904). Under his guidance, France took the first definite steps toward the separation of church and state. By 1904, through his efforts, nearly 10,000 religious schools had been closed, and thousands of priests and nuns left France rather than be persecuted.

Combes was vigorously opposed by all the conservative parties, who saw the mass closure of church schools as a persecution of religion. Combes led the anti-clerical coalition on the left, facing opposition primarily organized by the pro-Catholic party Action libérale populaire (ALP). ALP had a stronger popular base, with better financing and a stronger network of newspapers, but had far fewer seats in the Chamber of Deputies.

Among people who looked with favor on his stubborn enforcement of the law, he was familiarly called le petit père. In October 1904, his Minister of War, General André, was uncovered 'republicanizing' the army. He took the promotion process out of the hands of senior officers and handled it directly as a political matter. He used Freemasons to spy on the religious behavior of all 19,000 officers; they flagged the observant Catholics and André made sure they would not be promoted. Exposed as the Affaire Des Fiches, the scandal undermined support for the Combes government. It also undermined morale in the army, as officers realized that hostile spies examining their private lives were more important to their careers than their own professional accomplishments.

Finally, the defection of the Radical and Socialist groups induced him to resign on 17 January 1905, although he had not met an adverse vote in the Chamber. His policy was still carried on; and when the law of the separation of church and state was passed, all the leaders of the Radical parties entertained him at a noteworthy banquet in which they openly recognized him as the real originator of the movement.

According to Geoffrey Kurtz, the years of Émile Combes' administration were a period of social reform "without equal" during the era of the Third Republic, which included such reforms as an eight-hour day for miners, a ten-hour day for many workers, the lowering of mandatory military service from 3 to 2 years, the elimination of certain middle-class draft exemptions, and some modest public assistance for the chronically ill, the disabled, and the elderly. In 1903, safety standards were extended to shops and offices. After 1903, maternity leave and day care were provided to women in the French Postal Service. In addition, a 1904 law "pioneered assistance to the children of single mothers, ignoring invidious distinctions between married and single mothers, in order to prevent abandonment," while a law of March 1904 established public employment agencies. Decrees aimed at improving working conditions and establishing an eight-hour day in naval arsenals were also introduced.

== Later life ==
The campaign for the separation of church and state was the last big political action in his life. While still possessed of great influence over extreme Radicals, Combes took but little public part in politics after his resignation from the premiership in 1905. He joined the Aristide Briand ministry in October 1915 as one of the five Elder Statesmen, but without portfolio.

Combes died on 25 May 1921 in Pons, Charente-Maritime.

== Combes's Ministry, 7 June 1902 – 24 January 1905 ==
- Émile Combes – President of the Council and Minister of the Interior and Worship
- Théophile Delcassé – Minister of Foreign Affairs
- Louis André – Minister of War
- Maurice Rouvier – Minister of Finance
- Ernest Vallé – Minister of Justice
- Charles Camille Pelletan – Minister of Marine
- Joseph Chaumié – Minister of Public Instruction and Fine Arts
- Léon Mougeot – Minister of Agriculture
- Gaston Doumergue – Minister of Colonies
- Émile Maruéjouls – Minister of Public Works
- Georges Trouillot – Minister of Commerce, Industry, Posts, and Telegraphs

Changes

- 15 November 1904 – Maurice Berteaux succeeds André as Minister of War

== Notes ==
Political offices
Preceded by Pierre Waldeck-Rousseau	Prime Minister of France; 1902–1905	Succeeded by Maurice Rouvier
