= Pierre Chaumié =

French politician

Senator for Lot-et-Garonne
- In office 1934–1940

Member of the National Assembly
- In office 1944–1948

Personal details
- Born: Pierre Jean-Marie Bertrand Camille Chaumié; February 21, 1880 Agen, France
- Died: June 13, 1966 (aged 86) Paris, France
- Party: Radical
- Awards: Croix de Guerre; Légion d'honneur

Pierre Chaumié (21 February 1880 – 13 June 1966) was a French politician.

Pierre Jean-Marie Bertrand Camille Chaumié was born into a political family in Agen. He was the middle son of Joseph Chaumié (1849–1919), Senator for Lot-et-Garonne from 1897 to 1919. His brothers Jacques (1877–1920) and Emmanuel (1890–1934) were also active in politics.

Pierre attended the lycée at Agen before going to Paris where he studied at the Lycée Henri-IV and at the law faculty of the Sorbonne. During the First World War he served in the ranks of the French Army and received the Croix de Guerre and the Légion d'honneur, ending the war as a lieutenant. He left his legal career in 1919 to work as a manager in industry.

Following the death of Senator Georges Laboulbène in 1934, Chaumié followed in his father's footsteps, being elected in the subsequent by-election as Senator for Lot-et-Garonne, affiliated with the Radical Party. In June 1940, he was one of the 80 who voted against the grant of special powers to Philippe Pétain and the creation of the Vichy régime.

Associated with the French Resistance, he served in the National Assembly from 1944 through 1948 when he resigned. He was appointed to serve as a judge overseeing the granting of pardons. He died in Paris in 1966.
