= Charles Chanoine =

French military officer (1835–1915)

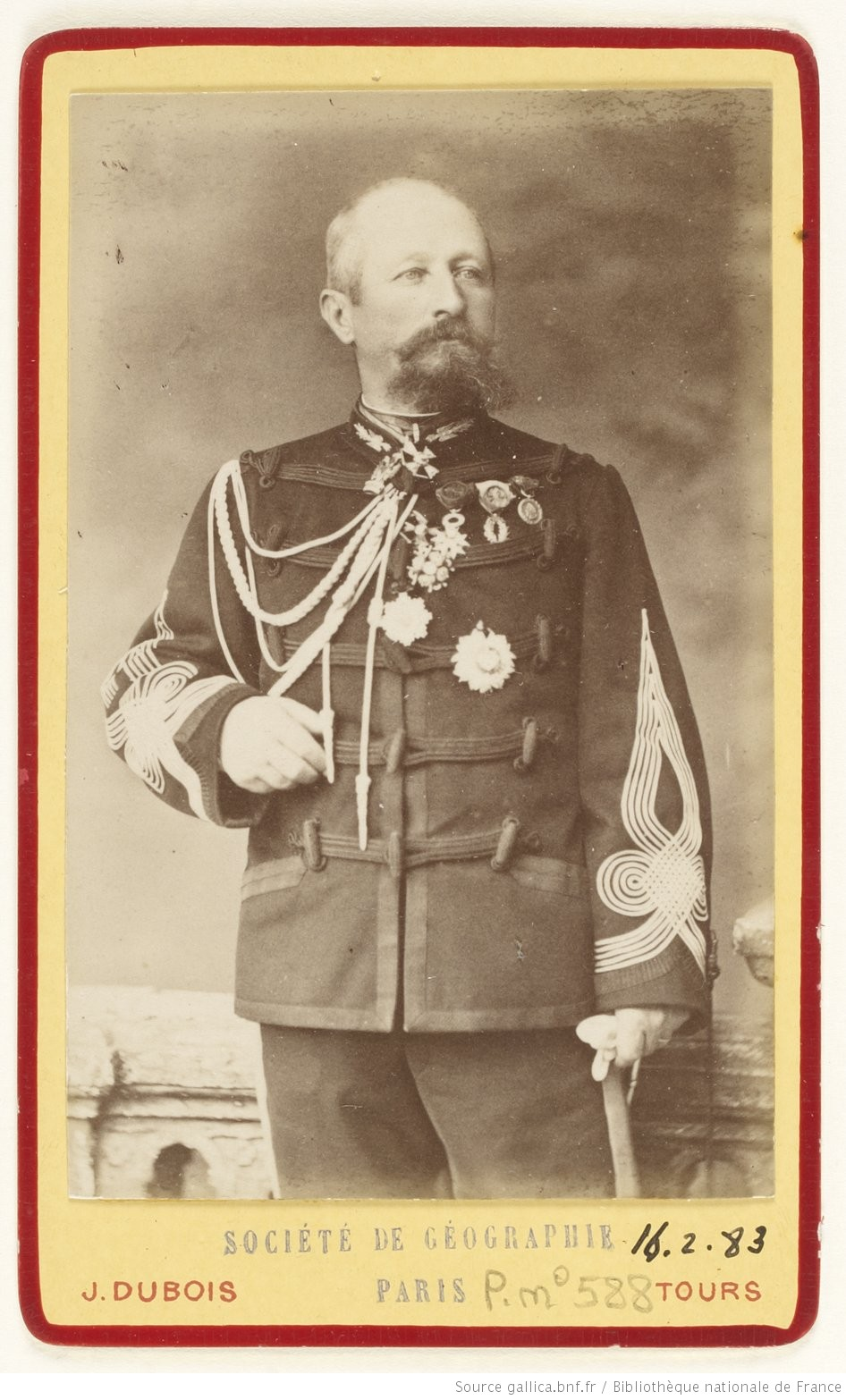
- Born: Charles Sulpice Jules Chanoine; 18 December 1835
- Died: 9 January 1915 (aged 79)
- Military career
- Allegiance: France
- Branch: French Army

Charles Sulpice Jules Chanoine (French: [ʃaʁl sylpis ʒyl ʃanwan]; 18 December 1835, Dijon, Côte-d'Or – 9 January 1915) was a French military officer who led the first French mission sent to Japan, between 1867 and 1868, and later served as Minister of War under the Third Republic.

== Life and career ==
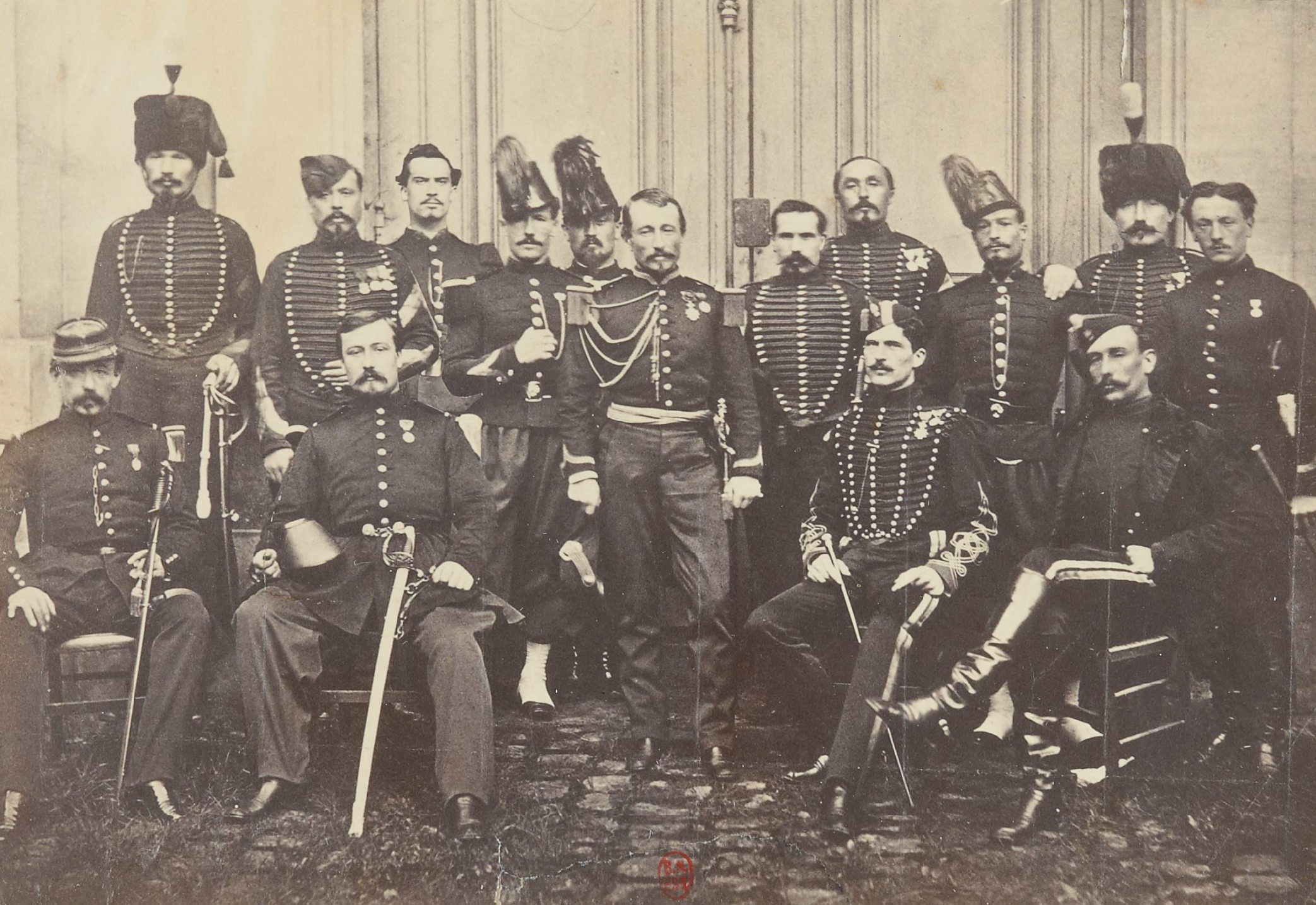
The French military mission before its departure to Japan, in 1867. Chanoine is standing in the center, Jules Brunet is second from right in the front row.

Early in his career, he served as chief of the French troops in China during the Second Opium War (1856–1860). Later, from 1867 to 1868, he was posted to Japan as the commander of the First French Military Mission to Japan, sent to that country by Napoleon III at the request of the 14th shōgun Tokugawa Iemochi. Among the officers under his command in Japan was Jules Brunet, who would play a key role in the conflict between the Shogun and the restoration forces of the Meiji Emperor during the Boshin War.

Due to the involvement of the Mission in supporting the Shogun, Chanoine had to leave Japan with the majority of the other French advisors in October 1868, per orders of the new emperor Meiji. Those who chose to remain, led by Jules Brunet, sent letters of resignation from the French army before joining the forces of the Shogun. This was done apparently with Chanoine's tacit agreement, as he covered up their departure for a period of several days.

As Henri Brisson's third Minister of War from September to October 1898, Chanoine, like his predecessors, Generals Cavaignac and Zurlinden, attempted to prevent a review of the Dreyfus case, against the wishes of the cabinet, which had already decided to support review. The indecision within the government caused by Chanoine's actions, as well as the chaos on the streets caused by the anti-Dreyfusards, led to the fall of the government.

During his Ministry, Chanoine named Jules Brunet, his former aide in Japan thirty years earlier, to the position of Chief of Staff of the French army ("Chef d'Etat Major").

Chanoine had a son, Lt. Julien Chanoine, who played a role in the French conquest of Chad, in the Voulet–Chanoine Mission.

== See also ==
- List of Defense Ministers of France
