= Le Matin (France) =

French newspaper

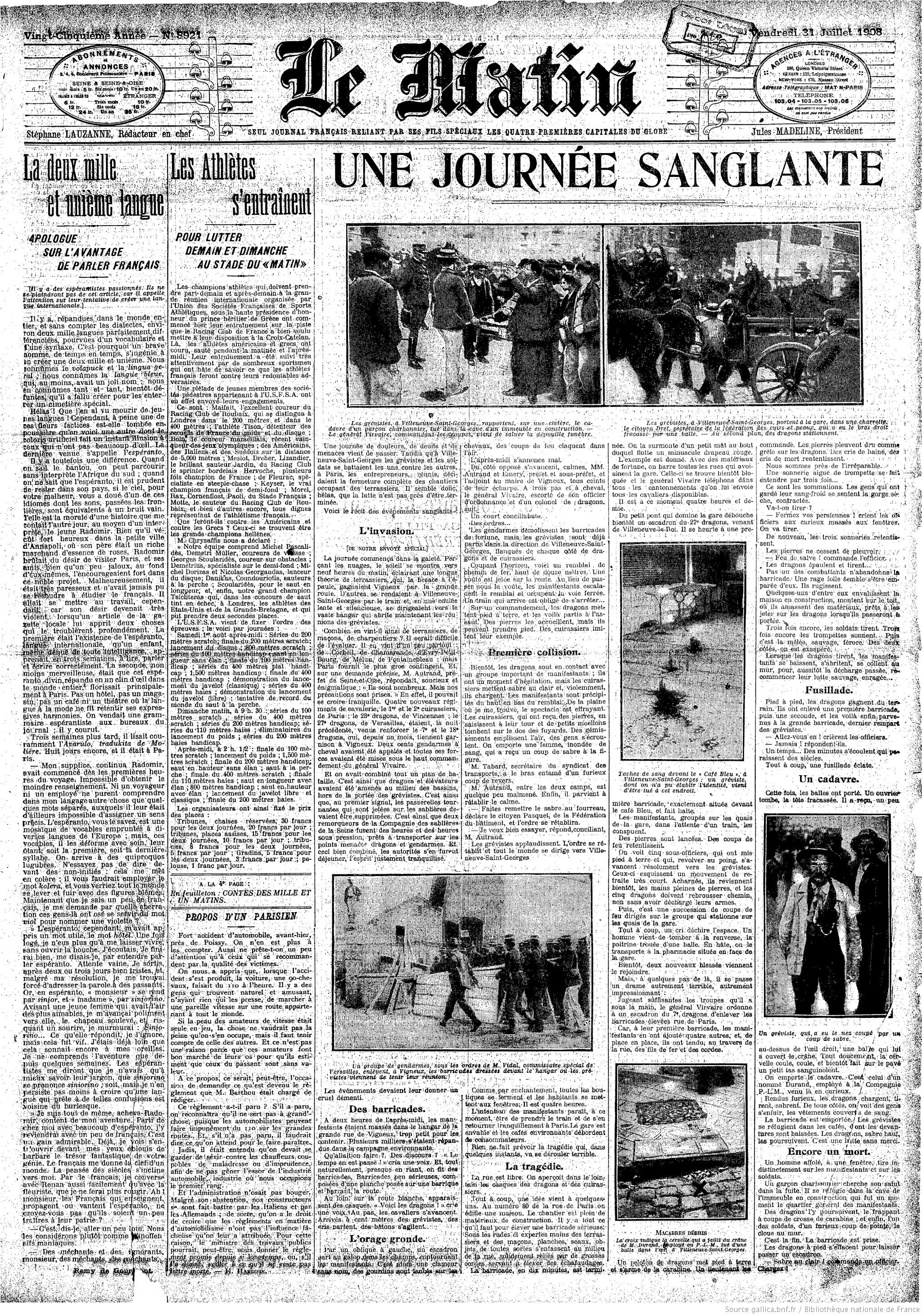
Le Matin 31 July 1908

Le Matin (French pronunciation: [lə matɛ̃], The Morning) was a French daily newspaper first published in February 26, 1884, and discontinued in 1944.

== History ==
Le Matin was launched on the initiative of Chamberlain & Co., a group of American financiers and the American newspaper editor Samuel Selwyn Chamberlain, in 1883, on the model of the British daily The Morning News. The direction of the project was entrusted to the French journalist Alfred Edwards, who launched the first issue on 26 February 1884. His home was then situated in the 10th arrondissement of Paris, at 6 boulevard Poissonnière, and his offices at numbers 3 to 9 on the same street.

A few months later, Edwards left Le Matin to found his own journal, Le Matin Français, which soon surpassed the circulation of Le Matin. Later Edwards bought Le Matin and merged the two papers. He modernized the resulting hybrid with the most modern techniques and technologies such as the telegraph, and signed great writers such as Jules Vallès and the député Arthur Ranc. Le Matin was thus favourable to moderate republicans and opposed to Boulangisme and socialist ideas.

Implicated in the Panama scandals, Edwards re-sold the newspaper in 1895 to the banker and advertiser Henri Poidatz, who invested considerably in advertising in it. The journal was particularly notable during the Dreyfus affair, as early as 1896 questioning the withheld evidence against the officer accused of treason and publishing in July, 1899 the confessions of commandant Esterhazy.

In May 1899, the newspaper followed a proven publicity and readership recruitment model by organising the Tour de France Automobile in conjunction with the Automobile Club de France. The newspaper's price rose to 5 centimes, like the majority of papers in this era, and its number of pages rose from 4 to 6. The same year the businessman Maurice Bunau-Varilla, at first one of the paper's shareholders, joined its board of directors, becoming its president in 1901. Borne along by effective advertising, by the catchy tone of its articles and its brave reporting, Le Matin continued to increase its circulation, from 100,000 copies in 1900 to around 700,000 in 1910 and more than a million around 1914. Le Matin was thus one of the four biggest daily French newspapers in the period before World War I, employing 150 journalists such as Gaston Leroux, Michel Zevaco and Albert Londres, along with 500 technicians and other workers. Félix Fénéon's Nouvelles en trois lignes appeared anonymously throughout the paper in 1906. In 1918, it made the first recorded use of jazband (French for a jazz band), and was subsequently cited in both Über englisches Sprachgut im Französischen and Grand Larousse Dictionnaire de la Langue Française although they mis-typed the date as 1908. Also in the inter-war period the paper had the Russian-exile cartoonist Alex Gard on its staff.

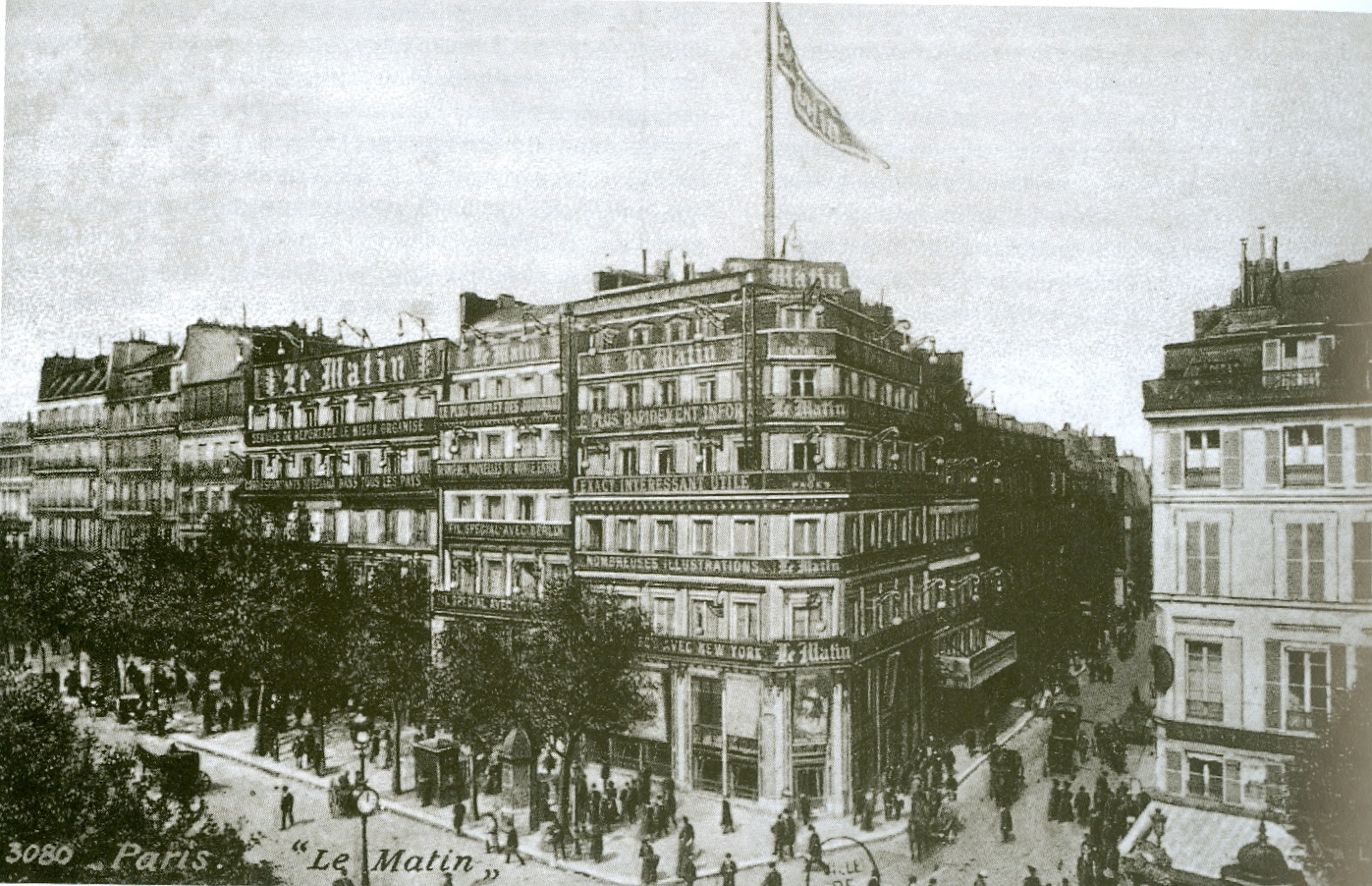
Their headquarters in 1890

Le Matin's political leanings moved progressively towards nationalism and, after World War I, were openly anti-parliamentary and anti-Communist. It approved of collaborationist policies in June 1940 and adopted a pro-Nazi line before disappearing on 17 August 1944, a few days after the death of Maurice Bunau-Varilla.

== See also ==
- History of French journalism
- Le Pays de France, weekly newspaper edited by Le Matin during World War I
