= Maurice Bunau-Varilla =

Maurice Bunau-Varilla (1856 – 1 August 1944) was a French press magnate, and proprietor of the newspaper Le Matin. During the Second World War, he made the newspaper's editorial line pro-German and pro-collaborationist, and it ceased publication 16 days after his death. Bunau-Varilla admired Adolf Hitler more out of his anti-Communist leanings than out of Nazi conviction.

Bunau-Varilla developed and promoted Synthol as a cure-all tonic. Now known as a mouthwash and hair product, as well as a treatment for muscular pain, it is still sold in France.

He was the brother of Philippe-Jean Bunau-Varilla, engineer and diplomat who was instrumental in the building of the Panama Canal.

== Sources ==
- (in French) Les sources d’archives relatives aux journaux et aux journalistes dans les fonds d’Archives privées (séries AB XIX, AP, AQ, AR, AS) XVIIIe-XXe siècles; Magali Lacousse Conservateur du patrimoine under the direction of Christine Nougaret, Conservateur général, responsable de la Section AP; p. 24; IV. Les Journalistes dans la série AR (Archives de presse) online.
