= Hervé Mangon =

French politician

Hervé Mangon (31 July 1821 – 17 May 1888) was a French politician of the French Third Republic. He was born in Paris, France. He was minister of agriculture (6 April – 9 November 1885) in the cabinet of Henri Brisson. He was a commander of the Legion of Honour.

== Sources ==
- "Hervé Mangon", in Adolphe Robert and Gaston Cougny, Dictionnaire des parlementaires français (1789–1891), Bourloton, Paris, 1889 Edition details Wikisource

== Bibliography ==
- Hervé Mangon, par Gaston Tissandier, La Nature no. 782 - 26 mai 1888
- "Hervé Mangon (1821–1888) - Gloubik Sciences". sciences.gloubik.info.
