= Minister of Commerce (France) =

Cabinet member in the Government of France

Ministry of Small and Medium-Sized Enterprises, Trade, Workmanship, Tourism, and Purchasing Power of Cabinet of France
- Ministre des Petites et Moyennes entreprises, du Commerce, de l’Artisanat, du Tourisme et du Pouvoir d’achat
- Incumbent; Serge Papin since 12 October 2025
- Reports to: The Prime Minister
- Seat: 7th arrondissement of Paris, Paris
- Nominator: Emmanuel Macron
- Appointer: Sébastien Lecornu
- Term length: No fixed term
- First holder: Gabriel Kaspereit, as Secretary of State for Small and Medium-Sized Industry and Crafts
- Salary: €10,700 gross monthly
- Website: https://www.economie.gouv.fr/entreprises

The Ministry of Small and Medium-Sized Enterprises, Trade, Workmanship, Tourism, and Purchasing Power (in French: Ministère des Petites et Moyennes Entreprises, du Commerce, de l'Artisanat, du Tourisme et du Pouvoir d'achat) is a governmental department in France. It was established in 1812 under the name Ministère des Manufactures et du Commerce, and its designation has evolved over time in accordance with the political periods and governments in power. The current ministry oversees the portfolios of workmanship, trade, tourism, and support for purchasing power. It is a fully operational ministry within the second government of Sébastien Lecornu, with Serge Papin serving as the incumbent minister since 12 October 2025.

The position sometimes included responsibility for other government departments such as Public Works, Interior, Agriculture and Posts, Telegraphs and Telephones. Initially focused on encouraging industry and commerce, the ministry's scope expanded in 1969 to include small and medium-sized industries as well as craftsmanship. Between 2000 and 2002, under the socialist Jospin government, it also incorporated the portfolio of Consumer Affairs. The ministry's remit further broadened to include liberal professions between 2002 and 2007, and again between 2010 and 2012. Under the presidency of Emmanuel Macron, it was incorporated into the Ministry of Economics, Finance, and Industrial and Digital Sovereignty. At that point, it became a fully-fledged ministry with the inclusion of the purchasing power portfolio.

The existence of a dedicated ministry to support craftsmanship and small and medium-sized enterprises is justified by the dominance of such enterprises in the French economy. According to statistics from the Ministry of the Economy and Finance, in 2022, France was home to 4.3 million microenterprises or very small businesses, as well as 172,000 small and medium-sized enterprises. In total, 2.3 million employees worked in microenterprises, and 4.5 million employees were employed in small and medium-sized enterprises.

== History ==
While policies concerning trade and industrial support were historically overseen by commercial councils under the French monarchy — bodies that functioned similarly to chambers of commerce—these prerogatives were transferred to the state during the French Revolution. This shift marked the beginning of the centralisation of economic policy in France and inaugurated a more interventionist role for public authorities in economic affairs. A dedicated governmental department, the Ministry of Manufactures and Trade, was established in 1811 under Napoleon Bonaparte. This new ministry was vested with broad responsibilities, including oversight of manufacturing, factories, commerce, food supplies, customs, and the mining council.

During the Second Empire, a larger ministry was created — encompassing Agriculture, Trade, and Public Works — which further reinforced the state's supervisory role in economic and industrial development. However, it was only with the advent of the Third Republic in 1870 that the Ministry of Trade became a truly influential department. Reorganised in 1881 under Léon Gambetta, it championed free trade and was tasked with developing foreign trade, promoting technical education, regulating commercial exchanges, and supporting industrial associations deemed beneficial to the economy. For Gambetta, the establishment of a strong Ministry of Trade symbolised both the advancement of French commerce and the consolidation of the relatively young republican regime, leading him to speak of a "Republic of Merchants". While the Second Empire had emphasised economic liberalism, the early Third Republic saw growing academic and political interest in state intervention, thereby justifying the creation of a dedicated ministry for trade. This initiative formed part of broader efforts to modernise and rebuild the economy in the aftermath of the Franco-Prussian War. In this context, the Minister of Trade in the Ferry government, Charles Hérisson, actively promoted French enterprises abroad. He facilitated their participation in international exhibitions, such as the 1876 International Exhibition of Electricity in Philadelphia and the 1885 Vienna exhibition of engines and machinery for small industries. From 1883 onward, foreign trade became a governmental priority. Hérisson established a Bureau of Commercial Information to support exports, encourage participation in overseas exhibitions, and promote international trade. Until 1905, the ministry also played a social role, particularly by overseeing industrial health and safety regulation. Concurrently, France adopted a protectionist tariff policy, notably through the Méline Tariff of 1892, which introduced preferential rates in agriculture. Additionally, France developed a preferential tariff zone with its colonies (the "Franc Zone"), modelled after the British Empire's system of imperial preference.

In 1913, the Ministry of Trade and Industry was expanded to include postal and telegraph services, forming a "super-ministry" tasked with bolstering economic development. This arrangement continued until 1928, when a separate Ministry of Posts and Telegraphs was established.

As World War II approached, the ministry was restructured as the "State Secretariat for Industrial Production" in 1940 — a designation revived in the post-war period. Following the Liberation in 1944, state intervention in commercial affairs intensified. From 1944 to 1947, the ministry was renamed the "Ministry of Industrial Production" and assumed responsibility for commercial professions, domestic trade, intellectual property, and craftsmanship. In the context of post-war reconstruction and the "Trente Glorieuses" (the thirty-year period of economic growth), the ministry was variously linked with portfolios such as Energy (1951–52), Reconstruction and Housing (1956), and others. This era also saw the rise of economic planning and the nationalisation of strategic sectors such as gas, electricity, and mining, driven in part by the demands of the French Communist Party. Simultaneously, France negotiated the establishment of the Common Agricultural Policy (CAP) within the European Economic Community (EEC) to support its domestic agricultural production. In 1968, the EEC introduced a Common External Tariff (CET), thereby transferring tariff policy competencies to European institutions.

From the 1970s onwards, the ministry's remit increasingly included consumer affairs and was frequently linked to the Ministry of the Economics and Finance, often as a subordinate department. The Directorate for Craftsmanship (Direction de l'Artisanat) was created in 1969 to develop and implement government policy on craftsmanship, oversee the chambers of trades, and support economic initiatives aimed at facilitating the establishment, development, and modernisation of artisanal businesses. In 1984, the ministry's remit was expanded to include tourism. Two years later, in 1986, Prime Minister Jacques Chirac appointed a Minister Delegate to the Minister of the Economy, responsible for Trade, Craftsmanship, and Services, as part of the government's broader programme of public sector privatisation. Between 1993 and 1995, during the cohabitation between Socialist President François Mitterrand and the liberal-conservative government of Édouard Balladur, the ministry was rebranded as the Ministry for Enterprises and Economic Development, with responsibility for SMEs, trade, and craftsmanship.

In 1997, the ministry became a Secretary of State within the Ministry of Economy and Finance, before regaining full ministerial status from 2004 to 2007 in the De Villepin government. During this period, the portfolio was extended to include liberal professions. From 2012 to 2014, under the Socialist Sylvia Pinel, the ministry again alternated between being a delegated ministry and a full ministry.

Absent during President Emmanuel Macron's first term, the ministry was reinstated in 2022, with Olivia Grégoire appointed Minister Delegate to the Minister of the Economy, Finance, and Industrial and Digital Sovereignty. It was briefly attached to the Ministry for Territorial Partnerships and Decentralisation from September to December 2024, during the conservative government of Michel Barnier. It regained full ministerial status on 12 October 2025, in the second government led by Sébastien Lecornu. For the first time, the ministerial title explicitly referenced "purchasing power". Shortly after Serge Papin, former CEO of the cooperative retailer Coopérative U, was appointed as minister, retail expert Dominique Crepy expressed criticism. In a statement to the online newspaper LSA, he questioned whether the ministry's title reflected a deeper conceptual confusion: "Does this not signify a state that no longer sees itself as the guarantor of conditions for economic freedom, but rather as the custodian of economic sentiment?"

In his first interview with La Tribune on 18 October 2025, Serge Papin outlined his agenda, which includes supporting small and medium-sized enterprises, defending the 2003 Dutreil Pact that facilitates the transfer of family businesses by exempting them under certain conditions from inheritance tax, and endorsing a €2 tax on small parcels to combat fast fashion — specifically targeting firms like Shein and Temu, accused of unfair competition against French fashion producers. In an interview with L’Opinion, Papin also advocated for a new form of employee profit-sharing, which would go beyond traditional savings schemes.

== Officeholders ==
=== Ministers of Commerce and Manufacture ===
In 1812 Napoleon created a Ministry of Commerce and Manufacture (Ministère du Commerce et des Manufactures), which he assigned to Jean-Baptiste Collin de Sussy. That ministry was suppressed in 1814.

- 16 January 1812 – 1 April 1814 : Jean-Baptiste Collin de Sussy

A royal ordinance of 22 January 1828 recreated the Ministry of Commerce and Manufacture, which covered manufacture and interior and exterior commerce, which were detached from the Ministry of the Interior. The ministry was suppressed by ordinance of 8 August 1829, and these services were again made part of the department of the interior.

- 29 January 1828 – 8 August 1829 : Pierre de Saint-Cricq

=== Ministers of Commerce and Public works ===
An ordinance of 17 March 1831 created the Ministry of Commerce and Public works (Ministère du Commerce et des Travaux publics), to which the minister had been named on 13 March 1831. This ministry included agriculture, subsistence, stud farms, interior and exterior commerce and statistics, detached from the department of the Interior.

- 13 March 1831 – 31 December 1832 : Antoine, comte d'Argout
- 31 December 1832 – 4 April 1834 : Adolphe Thiers

=== Ministers of Commerce ===
A royal ordinance of 6 April 1834 created the Ministry of Commerce (Ministère du Commerce), with the same functions as the Ministry of Commerce and Public works .

- 4 April 1834 – 10 November 1834 : Charles Marie Tanneguy Duchâtel
- 10 November 1834 – 18 November 1834 : Jean-Baptiste Teste
- 18 November 1834 – 22 February 1836 : Charles Marie Tanneguy Duchâtel

=== Ministers of Commerce and Public works ===
An ordinance of 2 March 1836 recreated the Ministry of Commerce and Public works, with the added responsibilities of bridges, roads and mines.

- 22 February 1836 – 6 September 1836 : Hippolyte Passy
- 6–19 September 1836 : Comte Duchatel (interim)

=== Ministers of Public Works, Agriculture and Commerce ===
An ordinance of 19 September 1836 changed the name without changing the function, to the Ministère des travaux publics, d'agriculture et du commerce'.

- 19 September 1836 – 31 March 1839 : Nicolas Martin du Nord
- 31 March 1839 – 12 May 1839 : Adrien de Gasparin

=== Ministers of Agriculture and Commerce ===
A royal ordinance of 23 May 1839 reconstituted the ministry as Agriculture and Commerce, with the same duties as that of the ordinance of 6 April 1834.

- 12 May 1839 – 1 March 1840 : Laurent Cunin-Gridaine
- 1 March 1840 – 29 October 1840 : Alexandre Goüin
- 29 October 1840 – 24 February 1848 : Laurent Cunin-Gridaine
- 24 February 1848 – 11 May 1848 : Eugène Bethmont
- 11 May 1848 – 28 June 1848 : Ferdinand Flocon
- 28 June 1848 – 20 December 1848 : Charles Gilbert Tourret
- 20 December 1848 – 29 December 1848 : Jacques Alexandre Bixio
- 9 December 1848 – 2 June 1849 : Louis Joseph Buffet
- 2 June 1849 – 31 October 1849 : Victor Ambroise LanJuneais
- 31 October 1849 – 9 January 1851 : Jean-Baptiste Dumas
- 9 January 1851 – 24 January 1851 : Louis Bernard Bonjean
- 24 January 1851 – 10 April 1851 : Eugène Schneider
- 10 April 1851 – 26 October 1851 : Louis Joseph Buffet
- 26 October 1851 – 26 November 1851 : François, comte de Casabianca
- 26 November 1851 – 25 January 1852 : Noël-Jacques Lefebvre-Duruflé

=== Ministers of the Interior, Agriculture and Commerce ===
A decree of 25 January 1852 reunited the Ministry of Agriculture and Commerce with that of the Interior, under the title Ministère de l'intérieur, de l'agriculture et du commerce.

- 25 January 1852 – 14 February 1853 : Victor Fialin, comte de Persigny

=== Ministers of Agriculture, Commerce and Public Works ===
A decree of 23 June 1853 reinstated the Ministry of Agriculture, Commerce and Public Works.

- 23 June 1853 – 3 February 1855 : Pierre Magne
- 3 February 1855 – 23 June 1863 : Eugène Rouher
- 23 June 1863 – 20 January 1867 : Armand Béhic
- 20 January 1867 – 17 December 1868 : Adolphe Forcade La Roquette
- 17 December 1868 – 17 July 1869 : Edmond Valléry Gressier

=== Ministers of Agriculture and Commerce ===
A decree of 17 July 1869 reestablished the Ministry of Agriculture and Commerce as it had been before the decree of 25 January 1852.

- 17 July 1869 – 2 January 1870 : Alfred Leroux
- 2 January 1870 – 10 August 1870 : Charles Louvet de Couvray
- 10 August 1870 – 4 September 1870 : Clément Aimé Jean Duvernois
- 4 September 1870 – 19 February 1871 : Pierre Magnin
- 19 February 1871 – 5 June 1871 : Félix Lambrecht
- 5 June 1871 – 6 February 1872 : Victor Lefranc
- 6 February 1872 – 23 April 1872 : Eugène de Goulard
- 23 April 1872 – 25 May 1873 : Pierre Teisserenc de Bort
- 25 May 1873 – 26 November 1873 : Joseph de la Bouillerie
- 29 November 1873 – 22 May 1874 : Alfred Deseilligny
- 22 May 1874 – 10 March 1875 : Louis Grivart
- 10 March 1875 – 9 March 1876 : Marie Camille Alfred, vicomte de Meaux
- 9 March 1876 – 17 May 1877 : Pierre Teisserenc de Bort
- 17 May 1877 – 23 November 1877 : Marie Camille Alfred, vicomte de Meaux
- 23 November 1877 – 13 December 1877 : Jules Ozenne
- 13 December 1877 – 4 February 1879 : Pierre Teisserenc de Bort
- 4 February 1879 – 4 March 1879 : Charles Lepère
- 5 March 1879 – 10 November 1881 : Pierre Tirard – Agriculture and Commerce.

=== Minister of Commerce and Colonies ===
- 14 November 1881 – 30 January 1882 : Maurice Rouvier – Commerce and Colonies

=== Ministers of Commerce ===
- 30 January 1882 – 7 August 1882 : Pierre Tirard – Commerce
- 7 August 1882 – 21 February 1883 : Pierre Legrand – Commerce
- 21 February 1883 – 14 October 1884 : Anne Charles Hérisson – Commerce
- 14 October 1884 – 6 April 1885 : Maurice Rouvier – Commerce
- 6 April 1885 – 9 November 1885 : Pierre Legrand – Commerce
- 9 November 1885 – 7 January 1886 : Lucien Dautresme – Commerce

=== Ministers of Commerce and Industry ===
- 7 January 1886 – 30 May 1887 : Édouard Lockroy – Commerce and Industry
- 30 May 1887 – 3 April 1888 : Lucien Dautresme – Commerce and Industry
- 3 April 1888 – 22 February 1889 : Pierre Legrand – Commerce
- 22 February 1889 – 17 March 1890 : Pierre Tirard – Commerce and Industry
- 17 March 1890 – 6 December 1892 : Jules Roche
- 6 December 1892 – 4 April 1893 : Jules Siegfried
- 4 April 1893 – 3 December 1893 : Louis Terrier
- 3 December 1893 – 30 May 1894 : Jean Marty
- 30 May 1894 – 26 January 1895 : Victor Lourties
- 26 January 1895 – 1 November 1895 : André Lebon
- 1 November 1895 – 29 April 1896 : Gustave Mesureur
- 29 April 1896 – 28 June 1898 : Henry Boucher
- 28 June 1898 – 1 November 1898 : Émile Maruéjouls
- 1 November 1898 – 22 June 1899 : Paul Delombre
- 22 June 1899 – 7 June 1902 : Alexandre Millerand
- 7 June 1902 – 24 January 1905 : Georges Trouillot
- 24 January 1905 – 12 November 1905 : Fernand Dubief
- 12 November 1905 – 14 March 1906 : Georges Trouillot
- 14 March 1906 – 4 January 1908 : Gaston Doumergue
- 4 January 1908 – 24 July 1909 : Jean Cruppi
- 24 July 1909 – 2 March 1911 : Jean Dupuy
- 2 March 1911 – 27 June 1911 : Alfred Massé
- 27 June 1911 – 14 January 1912 : Maurice Couyba
- 14 January 1912 – 21 January 1913 : Fernand David
- 21 January 1913 – 22 March 1913 : Gabriel Guist'hau

=== Ministers of Commerce, Industry, Posts, and Telegraphs ===
- 22 March 1913 – 9 December 1913 : Alfred Massé
- 9 December 1913 – 17 March 1914 : Louis Malvy
- 17 March 1914 – 9 June 1914 : Raoul Péret
- 9 June 1914 – 13 June 1914 : Marc Réville
- 13 June 1914 – 29 October 1915 : Gaston Thomson
- 29 October 1915 – 16 November 1917 : Étienne Clémentel
- 16 November 1917 – 5 May 1919 : Étienne Clémentel
- 5 May 1919 – 27 November 1919 : Étienne Clémentel
- 27 November 1919 – 20 January 1920 : Louis Dubois
- 20 January 1920 – 16 January 1921 : Augustuste Isaac
- 16 January 1921 – 29 March 1924 : Lucien Dior
- 29 March 1924 – 9 June 1924 : Louis Loucheur
- 9 June 1924 – 14 June 1924 : Pierre Étienne Flandin
- 14 June 1924 – 17 April 1925 : Eugène Raynaldy
- 17 April 1925 – 29 October 1925 : Charles Chaumet
- 29 October 1925 – 23 June 1926 : Charles Daniel-Vincent
- 23 June 1926 – 19 July 1926 : Fernand Chapsal
- 19 July 1926 – 23 July 1926 : Louis Loucheur
- 23 July 1926 – 2 September 1928 : Maurice Bokanowski
- 14 September 1928 – 11 November 1928 : Henry Chéron

=== Ministers of Commerce and Industry ===
- 11 November 1928 – 3 November 1929 : Georges Bonnefous
- 3 November 1929 – 21 February 1930 : Pierre Étienne Flandin
- 21 February 1930 – 2 March 1930 : Georges Bonnet
- 2 March 1930 – 13 December 1930 : Pierre Étienne Flandin
- 13 December 1930 – 27 January 1931 : Louis Loucheur
- 27 January 1931 – 20 February 1932 : Louis Rollin
- 20 February 1932 – 3 June 1932 : Louis Rollin
- 3 June 1932 – 31 January 1933 : Julien Durand (Commerce and Industry)
- 31 January 1933 – 26 October 1933 : Louis Serre
- 26 October 1933 – 30 January 1934 : Laurent Eynac
- 30 January 1934 – 9 February 1934 : Jean Mistler
- 9 February 1934 – 8 November 1934 : Lucien Lamoureux
- 8 November 1934 – 1 June 1935 : Paul Marchandeau
- 1 June 1935 – 7 June 1935 : Laurent Eynac
- 7 June 1935 – 4 June 1936 : Georges Bonnet
- 4 June 1936 – 22 June 1937 : Paul Bastid
- 22 June 1937 – 18 January 1938 : Fernand Chapsal
- 18 January 1938 – 10 April 1938 : Pierre Cot (Commerce)
- 10 April 1938 – 21 March 1940 : Fernand Gentin
- 21 March 1940 – 18 May 1940 : Louis Rollin
- 18 May 1940 – 5 June 1940 : Léon Baréty
- 5 June 1940 – 16 June 1940 : Albert Chichery
- 16 June 1940 – 12 July 1940 : Yves Bouthillier
- 7 June 1943 – 9 November 1943 : André Diethelm (Commissaire)
- 22 January 1947 – 11 August 1947 : Jean Letourneau
- 11 August 1947 – 22 October 1947 : Robert Lacoste
- 24 November 1947 – 7 February 1950 : Robert Lacoste
- 7 February 1950 – 11 August 1951 : Jean-Marie Louvel
- 11 August 1951 – 20 January 1952 : Pierre Pflimlin
- 20 January 1952 – 8 March 1952 : Édouard Bonnefous
- 8 March 1952 – 8 January 1953 : Jean-Marie Louvel
- 8 January 1953 – 11 February 1953 : Paul Ribeyre
- 11 February 1953 – 28 June 1953 : Guy Petit
- 28 June 1953 – 19 June 1954 : Jean-Marie Louvel
- 19 June 1954 – 3 September 1954 : Maurice Bourgès-Maunoury
- 3 September 1954 – 23 February 1955 : Henri Ulver
- 23 February 1955 – 1 February 1956 : André Morice
- 6 November 1957 – 1 June 1958 : Paul Ribeyre
- 9 June 1958 – 8 January 1959 : Édouard Ramonet
- 8 January 1959 – 14 April 1962 : Jean-Marcel Jeanneney (Industry)
- 6 July 1972 – 5 April 1973 : Yvon Bourges
- 5 April 1973 – 1 March 1974 : Jean Royer
- 1 March 1974 – 28 May 1974 : Yves Guéna (Industry, Commerce and Crafts)
- 28 May 1974 – 25 August 1976 : Vincent Ansquer
- 25 August 1976 – 30 March 1977 : Pierre Brousse
- 30 March 1977 – 5 April 1978 : René Monory
- 5 April 1978 – 4 July 1979 : Jacques Barrot
- 4 July 1979 – 22 May 1981 : Maurice Charretier
- 22 May 1981 – 22 March 1983 : André Delelis
- 22 March 1983 – 19 February 1986 : Michel Crépeau
- 19 February 1986 – 20 March 1986 : Jean-Marie Bockel
- 29 March 1993 – 18 May 1995 : Alain Madelin
- 18 May 1995 – 4 June 1997 : Jean-Pierre Raffarin (Small and Medium Enterprises, Commerce and Crafts)
- 29 November 2004 – 31 May 2005: Christian Jacob (Small and Medium Enterprises, Commerce, Crafts, Liberal Professions and Consumer Affairs)
- 2 June 2005 – 15 May 2007: Christine Lagarde

=== Secretary of State for Foreign Trade ===
- 19 July 2007 – 18 March 2008: Hervé Novelli
- 16 May 2012 – 31 March 2014: Sylvia Pinel (Minister of Crafts, Trade, and Tourism)
- 16 May 2012 – 2 April 2014 : Fleur Pellerin (Secretary of State for Foreign Trade, Tourism Promotion, and French Nationals Abroad )

=== Minister Delegate ===
- 6 July 2020 – 8 December 2021 : Alain Griset (Small and Medium-Sized Enterprises)
- 8 December 2021 – 20 May 2022 : Jean-Baptiste Lemoyne (Tourism, French Nationals Abroad, the Francophonie, and Small and Medium-Sized Enterprises)
- 4 July 2022 – 21 September 2024: Olivia Grégoire (Small and Medium-Sized Enterprises, Trade, Craftsmanship, and Tourism until January 2024; Minister Delegate for Business, Tourism, and Consumer Affairs until September 2024)
- 23 December 2024 – 8 September 2025 : Véronique Louwagie

=== Ministry of Small and Medium-Sized Enterprises, Trade, Wormanship, Tourism, and Purchasing Power ===
- 12 October 2025 : Serge Papin
