= Maurice Rouvier =

French statesman (1842–1911)

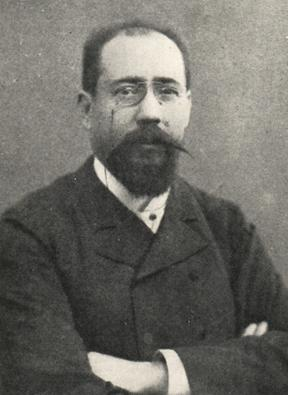

Prime Minister of France
- In office 24 January 1905 – 12 March 1906
- President: Émile Loubet; Armand Fallières
- Preceded by: Émile Combes
- Succeeded by: Ferdinand Sarrien
- In office 30 May 1887 – 12 December 1887
- President: Jules Grévy; Sadi Carnot
- Preceded by: René Goblet
- Succeeded by: Pierre Tirard

Personal details
- Born: 17 April 1842 Aix-en-Provence
- Died: 7 June 1911 (aged 69) Neuilly-sur-Seine
- Spouse: Marie-Noémi Cadiot

Maurice Rouvier (French: [mɔʁis ʁuvje, moʁ-]; 17 April 1842 – 7 June 1911) was a French statesman of the "Opportunist" faction, who twice served as the Prime Minister of France. He is best known for his financial policies and his unpopular policies designed to avoid a rupture with Germany.

== Career ==
He was born in Aix-en-Provence, and spent his early career in business at Marseille. He supported Léon Gambetta's candidature there in 1867, and in 1870 he founded an anti-imperial journal, L'Egalité. He also belonged to the same masonic lodge as Gambetta, "La Réforme" in Marseille. Becoming secretary general of the prefecture of Bouches-du-Rhône in 1870–71, he refused the office of prefect. In July 1871 he was returned to the National Assembly for Marseille at a by-election, and voted steadily with the Republican party. He became a recognized authority on finance, and repeatedly served on the Budget Commission as reporter or president.

At the general elections of 1881, after the fall of the Jules Ferry cabinet he was returned to the chamber on a programme which included the separation of Church and State, a policy of decentralization, and the imposition of an income tax. He then joined Gambetta's cabinet as minister of commerce and the colonies, and in the 1883-85 cabinet of Jules Ferry he held the same office. He became premier and minister of finance on 31 May 1887, with the support of the moderate republican groups, the Radicals holding aloof in support of General Boulanger, who began a violent agitation against the government.

Then came the scandal of the decorations in which President Grévy's son-in-law Daniel Wilson figured, and the Rouvier cabinet fell in its attempt to screen the president. Rouvier's opposition in his capacity of president of the Budget Commission was one of the causes of the defeat of Charles Floquet's cabinet in February 1889. In the new Tirard ministry formed to combat the Boulangist agitation, he was minister of finance. He kept the same post in the Freycinet, Loubet and Ribot cabinets of 1890–93. Accusations that he accepted bribes from Cornelius Herz and the baron de Reinach compelled his resignation from the Ribot cabinet during the Panama scandals in December 1892. He became a successful banker and was known for his thorough familiarity with financial and budgetary issues.

== Prime minister ==
In 1902, he once again became minister of finance, after nearly ten years of exclusion from office, in the Radical cabinet of Émile Combes; and on the fall of the Combes ministry in January 1905 he was invited by the president to form a new ministry. In this cabinet he at first held the ministry of finance. In his initial declaration to the chamber the new premier had declared his intention of continuing the policy of the previous cabinet, pledging the new ministry to a policy of conciliation, to the consideration of old age pensions, an income-tax, and separation of Church and State. Under a law passed in April 1905, for instance, a certain credit was earmarked in the French budget for the purpose of public subsidies for unemployment benefit funds. On March the 17th, 1905, a law was passed that strengthened (as noted by one study) “control over life insurance companies and over all operations involving the duration of human life.”

=== Foreign policy ===
Public attention, however, was chiefly concentrated on foreign policy. During the Combes ministry Theophile Delcassé had come to a secret understanding with Spain on the Moroccan question, and had established an understanding with Britain. His policy had aroused German jealousy, which became evident in the asperity with which the question of Morocco was handled in Berlin.

At a cabinet meeting on 6 June Rouvier reproached the Foreign Minister with imprudence over Morocco, and after a heated discussion, Delcassé resigned. Rouvier himself took the portfolio of foreign affairs at this crucial point. After critical negotiations, he secured on 8 July an agreement with Germany accepting the international conference proposed by the sultan of Morocco on the assurance that Germany would recognize the special nature of the interest of France in maintaining order on the frontier of her Algerian empire. Lengthy discussions resulted in a new convention in September, which contained the programme of the proposed conference, and in December Rouvier was able to make a statement about the whole proceedings in the chamber, which received the assent of all parties. Rouvier's government did not long survive the presidential election of 1906.

=== Church and state ===
In 1905, the government introduced the law on the separation of Church and State, heavily supported by Emile Combes, who had been strictly enforcing the 1901 voluntary association law and the 1904 law on religious congregations' freedom of teaching (more than 2,500 private teaching establishments were by then closed by the State, causing bitter opposition from the Catholic and conservative population). On 10 February 1905, the Chamber declared that "the attitude of the Vatican" had rendered the separation of Church and State inevitable and the law of the separation of church and state was passed in December, 1905. The disturbances arising in connection with the Separation Law were skillfully handled by Georges Clemenceau to discredit the ministry, which gave place to a cabinet under the direction of Sarrien. He died in Neuilly-sur-Seine.

== Rouvier’s First Ministry, 30 May – 12 December 1887 ==
- Maurice Rouvier – President of the Council and Minister of Finance
- Émile Flourens – Minister of Foreign Affairs
- Théophile Adrien Ferron – Minister of War
- Armand Fallières – Minister of the Interior
- Charles Mazeau – Minister of Justice
- Édouard Barbey – Minister of Marine and Colonies
- Eugène Spuller – Minister of Public Instruction, Fine Arts, and Worship
- François Barbé – Minister of Agriculture
- Severiano de Heredia – Minister of Public Works
- Lucien Dautresme – Minister of Commerce and Industry

Changes

- 30 November 1887 – Armand Fallières succeeds Mazeau as interim Minister of Justice, remaining also Minister of the Interior.

== Rouvier's Second Ministry, 24 January 1905 – 13 March 1906 ==
- Maurice Rouvier - President of the Council and Minister of Finance
- Théophile Delcassé - Minister of Foreign Affairs
- Maurice Berteaux - Minister of War
- Eugène Étienne - Minister of the Interior
- Joseph Chaumié - Minister of Justice
- Gaston Thomson - Minister of Marine
- Jean-Baptiste Bienvenu-Martin - Minister of Public Instruction, Fine Arts, and Worship
- Joseph Ruau - Minister of Agriculture
- Étienne Clémentel - Minister of Colonies
- Armand Gauthier de l'Aude - Minister of Public Works
- Fernand Dubief - Minister of Commerce, Industry, Posts, and Telegraphs

Changes

- 6 June 1905 - Rouvier succeeds Delcassé as Minister of Foreign Affairs.
- 17 June 1905 - Pierre Merlou succeeds Rouvier as Minister of Finance.
- 12 November 1905 - Eugène Étienne succeeds Berteaux as Minister of War. Fernand Dubief succeeds Étienne as Minister of the Interior. Georges Trouillot succeeds Dubief as Minister of Commerce, Industry, Posts, and Telegraphs

== Cultural references ==
- Appears as a minor character in the historical-mystery novel Stone's Fall, by Iain Pears.

Political offices
| Preceded by Georges Charles Cloué | Minister of Colonies; 1881–1882 | Succeeded by Jean Bernard Jauréguiberry |
| Preceded by Pierre Tirard | Minister of Commerce; 1881–1882 | Succeeded by Pierre Tirard |
| Preceded by Anne Charles Hérisson | Minister of Commerce; 1884–1885 | Succeeded by Pierre Legrand |
| Preceded by René Goblet | Prime Minister of France; 1887 | Succeeded by Pierre Tirard |
| Preceded by Albert Dauphin | Minister of Finance; 1887 | Succeeded by Pierre Tirard |
| Preceded by Paul Peytral | Minister of Finance; 1889–1892 | Succeeded by Pierre Tirard |
| Preceded by Joseph Caillaux | Minister of Finance; 1902–1905 | Succeeded by Pierre Merlou |
| Preceded by Émile Combes | Prime Minister of France; 1905–1906 | Succeeded by Ferdinand Sarrien |
| Preceded by Théophile Delcassé | Minister of Foreign Affairs; 1905–1906 | Succeeded by Léon Bourgeois |
