= René Goblet =

French politician

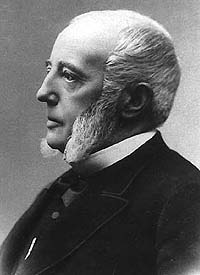

Prime Minister of France
- In office 16 December 1886 – 30 May 1887
- President: Jules Grévy
- Preceded by: Charles de Freycinet
- Succeeded by: Maurice Rouvier

Personal details
- Born: 26 November 1828; Aire-sur-la-Lys
- Died: 13 September 1905 (aged 76); Paris
- Political party: None

René Marie Goblet (French: [ʁəne ɡɔblɛ]; 26 November 1828 – 13 September 1905) was a French politician, Prime Minister of France for a period in 1886–1887.

== Biography ==
He was born at Aire-sur-la-Lys, Pas-de-Calais and was trained in law. Under the Second Empire, he helped found a Liberal journal, Le Progrès de la Somme, and in July 1871 he was sent by the département of the Somme to the National Assembly, where he took his place on the extreme left, as a member of the Republican Union parliamentary group (Union républicaine). Having failed to secure election in 1876, he was returned for Amiens the following year. He held a minor government office in 1879, and in 1882 became minister of the interior in the Freycinet cabinet. He was minister of education, fine arts and religion in Henri Brisson's first cabinet in 1885, and again under Freycinet in 1886, when he greatly increased his reputation by an able defence of the government's education proposals.

Meanwhile, his independence and outspokenness had alienated him from many of his party, and throughout his life he was frequently in conflict with his political associates, from Léon Gambetta downwards. On the fall of the Freycinet cabinet in December he formed a cabinet in which be reserved for himself the portfolios of the interior and of religion. The Goblet cabinet was unpopular from the outset, and it was with difficulty that anybody could be found to accept the ministry of foreign affairs, which was finally given to Gustave Flourens.

Then came what is known as the Schnaebele incident, the arrest on the German frontier of a French official named Schnaebele, which caused immense excitement in France. For some days Goblet took no definite decision, but left Flourens, who stood for peace, to fight it out with General Boulanger, the minister of war, who urged the despatch of an ultimatum. Although he finally intervened on the side of Flourens, and peace was preserved, his weakness in the face of Boulangist propaganda became a national danger.

Defeated on the budget in May 1887, his government resigned; but he returned to office next year as foreign minister in the radical administration of Charles Floquet. He was defeated at the polls by a Boulangist candidate in 1889, and sat in the senate from 1891 to 1893 when he returned to the popular chamber. In association with Édouard Locroy, Ferdinand Sarrien and Paul Peytral he drew up a republican programme which they put forward in La Petite République française. At the elections of 1898 he was defeated, and from then on took little part in public affairs. He died in Paris.

== Goblet's Ministry, 16 December 1886 – 30 May 1887 ==
- René Goblet – President of the Council, Minister of the Interior, and Minister of Worship
- Émile Flourens – Minister of Foreign Affairs
- Georges Boulanger – Minister of War
- Albert Dauphin – Minister of Finance
- Ferdinand Sarrien – Minister of Justice
- Théophile Aube – Minister of Marine and Colonies
- Marcellin Berthelot – Minister of Public Instruction and Fine Arts
- Jules Develle – Minister of Agriculture
- Édouard Millaud – Minister of Public Works
- Félix Granet – Minister of Posts and Telegraphs
- Édouard Lockroy – Minister of Commerce and Industry

Political offices
Preceded by René Waldeck-Rousseau	Minister of the Interior; 1882	Succeeded by Armand Fallières
Preceded by Armand Fallières	Minister of Public Instruction; 1885–1886	Succeeded by Marcelin Berthelot
Preceded by Félix Martin-Feuillée	Minister of Worship; 1885–1887	Succeeded by Eugène Spuller
Preceded by Charles de Freycinet	Prime Minister of France; 1886–1887	Succeeded by Maurice Rouvier
Preceded by Ferdinand Sarrien	Minister of the Interior; 1886–1887	Succeeded by Armand Fallières
Preceded by Émile Flourens	Minister of Foreign Affairs; 1888–1889	Succeeded by Eugène Spuller
