= Louis Dubois (politician) =

French politician

Louis Joseph Marie Dubois
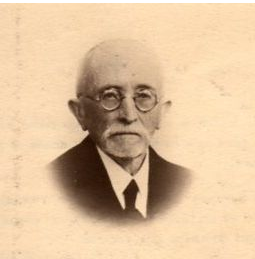

Minister of Commerce, Industry, Posts and Telegraphs
- In office 27 November 1919 – 20 January 1920
- Prime Minister: Georges Clemenceau
- Preceded by: Étienne Clémentel
- Succeeded by: Auguste Isaac

Personal details
- Born: 4 December 1837 Le Palais, Morbihan, France
- Died: 12 November 1914 (aged 76) Puteaux, Seine, France

Louis Joseph Marie Dubois (10 June 1859 – 20 January 1946) was a French politician who was Minister of Commerce, Industry, Posts and Telegraphs in the second cabinet of Georges Clemenceau.

== Life ==
=== Early years ===
Louis Joseph Marie Dubois was born on 10 June 1859 in Le Palais, Morbihan, slave of a merchant ship owner. He went to schools in Lamballe and Dinan for his secondary education. In 1878 he was a volunteer. In 1879 he attended the Vincennes Administration School and became an administrative officer.

=== Businessman ===
Dubois resigned in 1890 and founded Le Tourangeau, a newspaper that appeared weekly and then bi-weekly in Tours. The paper campaigned for reconstruction of the vineyards and improved methods of cultivation. At the same time he founded several regional agricultural and wine unions, and became secretary-general of the Union of Indre-et-Loire Vineyard Owners". He was active in a movement to improve Loire navigation.

Around 1893 Dubois met M. P. Prieur, inventor of processes to print photographs using three colors. They founded the firm of "Prieur et Dubois" in Puteaux, which made photo-engravings and tricolor prints. The firm's luxury prints and reproductions of artworks won prizes at the universal exhibitions in St. Louis (1904), Liège (1905), Milan (1906), London (1908), Brussels (1910) and Turin (1911). Dubois also founded the Journal de l'Entreprise et de l'Industrie (Journal of Enterprise and Industry) in Paris, which became the Moniteur des Travaux publics (Monitor of Public Works).

=== Politician ===
In 1904 Dubois competed unsuccessfully for election to the General Council of the Seine department as Republican candidate for the canton of Puteaux. On 6 May 1906 he ran unsuccessfully for deputy for the 6th arrondissement of Saint-Denis. In the general elections of April–May 1910 he succeeded in being elected as deputy for the 6th district of Saint-Denis. He joined the Progressive Republican group. Dubois was reelected in the general elections of April–May 1914. After World War I (1914–18) he was a member of the committee that reviewed the various peace treaties in 1919, and was responsible for a report on the draft law to ratify the Treaty of Versailles.

Dubois was reelected for the 4th district of the Seine in the general elections of 16 November 1919, running on the Democratic Republican Union platform, He was Minister of Commerce, Industry, Posts and Telegraphs, with responsibility for maritime transport and the merchant marine, from 27 November 1919 to 20 January 1920 in the second cabinet of Georges Clemenceau. On 19 May 1920 he was appointed French representative on the International Reparations Commission, and became president. He resigned from this position on 2 September 1922. Dubois was reelected in the general elections of 11 May 1924 and again in the general elections of 22–29 April 1928. He was defeated in the general elections of May 1932. Louis Dubois died on 18 January 1946 in Puteaux, Seine.

== Sources ==
- Jolly, Jean (1977). "Louis, Joseph, Marie DUBOIS". Dictionnaire des parlementaires français de 1889 à 1940 (in French).
