= Maurice Couyba =

French professor and politician

Charles Maurice Couyba
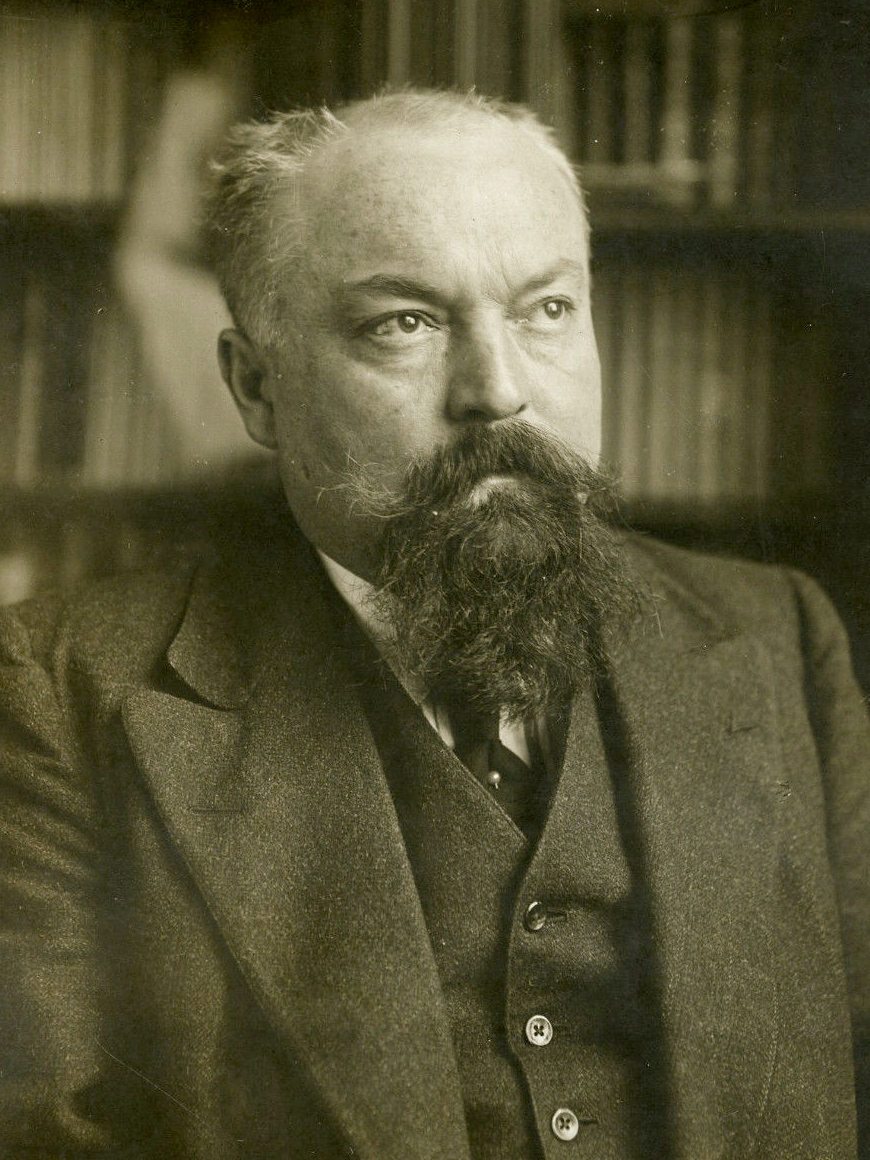

Minister of Commerce and Industry
- In office 27 June 1911 – 11 January 1912
- Prime Minister: Joseph Caillaux
- Preceded by: Alfred Massé
- Succeeded by: Fernand David

Minister of Labor and Social Welfare
- In office 13 June 1914 – 26 August 1914
- Prime Minister: René Viviani
- Preceded by: Jean-Baptiste Abel
- Succeeded by: Jean-Baptiste Bienvenu-Martin

Personal details
- Born: 1 January 1866 Dampierre-sur-Salon, Haute-Saône, France
- Died: 18 November 1931 (aged 65) Paris, France
- Occupation: Journalist, playwright, songwriter

Charles Maurice Couyba (1 January 1866 – 18 November 1931) was a French professor and politician. He was a deputy from 1897 to 1907, then a senator from 1907 to 1920. He was Minister of Commerce and Industry from 1911 to 1912, and was briefly Minister of Labor and Social Welfare in 1914. Under the pseudonym of Maurice Boukay he was also a poet and songwriter.

== Life ==
Charles Maurice Couyba was born on 1 January 1866 in Dampierre-sur-Salon, Haute-Saône. Couyba obtained an Associate of Philosophy degree in history and a doctorate in law. He started out as a journalist before moving into politics. He was elected general counsel of Haute-Saône in 1895.

Couyba was deputy for Haute-Saône from 1897 to 1907. He joined the radical left group in the Chamber, and was mainly involved in questions related to art and education. He was rapporteur for the Fine Arts budget from 1902 to 1907. His 1902 book on The Art and Democracy was based on his report on the fine Arts budget. The book proposes a policy that reconciles the principles of "freedom" and "authority", where the state supports but does not overly restrict the arts. Under the pseudonym "Maurice Boukay" he was author of the Chansons rouges.

Couyba was elected to the Senate on 7 January 1907 and reelected on 3 January 1909. He was Minister of Commerce and Industry from 27 June 1911 to 11 January 1912. He was Minister of Labor and Social Assurance from 13 June 1914 to 26 August 1914. He left the Senate on 10 January 1920, when he failed to be reelected. He died on 18 November 1931 in Paris.

== Posterity ==
Charles Maurice Couyba was represented by Jules Adler and Arnaud Courlet de Vregille.

== Publications ==
- Charles-Maurice Couyba (1890-03-23). L'Escholier et l'Étudiant (in French). With Gabriel Montoya, presented at the fête de l'Association générale des étudiants de Lyon, Casino des arts.
- Maurice Boukay (1893). Chansons d'amour (in French). preface by Paul Verlaine.
- Maurice Boukay (1895). Nouvelles chansons : rêves, joies, regrets (PDF) (in French). Preface by Sully Prudhomme. Flammarion.
- Maurice Boukay (1897). Chansons rouges (in French). Music by Marcel Legay, illustrations by Théophile Alexandre Steinlen.
- Charles-Maurice Couyba (1901). Classiques et modernes. La réforme de l'enseignement secondaire (PDF) (in French).
- Charles-Maurice Couyba (1902). L'Art et la démocratie : les écoles, les théâtres, les manufactures, les musées, les monuments (PDF) (in French).
- Charles-Maurice Couyba (1908). Les Beaux-Arts et la nation (PDF) (in French).
- Maurice Boukay (1913). La Chanson des mois pour la jeunesse (in French). Music by Marcel Legay.
- Maurice Boukay (April 1913). Panurge (in French). Musical farce in 3 acts, after François Rabelais, with Georges Spitzmuller, music by Jules Massenet, Paris, Théâtre lyrique municipal.
- Maurice Boukay (November 1913). Françoise (in French). Lyric drama in 4 acts, with Édouard Francklin, music by Charles Pons, Lyon, Grand Théâtre.
- Charles-Maurice Couyba (1914). Le Parlement français (in French).
