= Charles Lepère =

French politician, journalist and lawyer

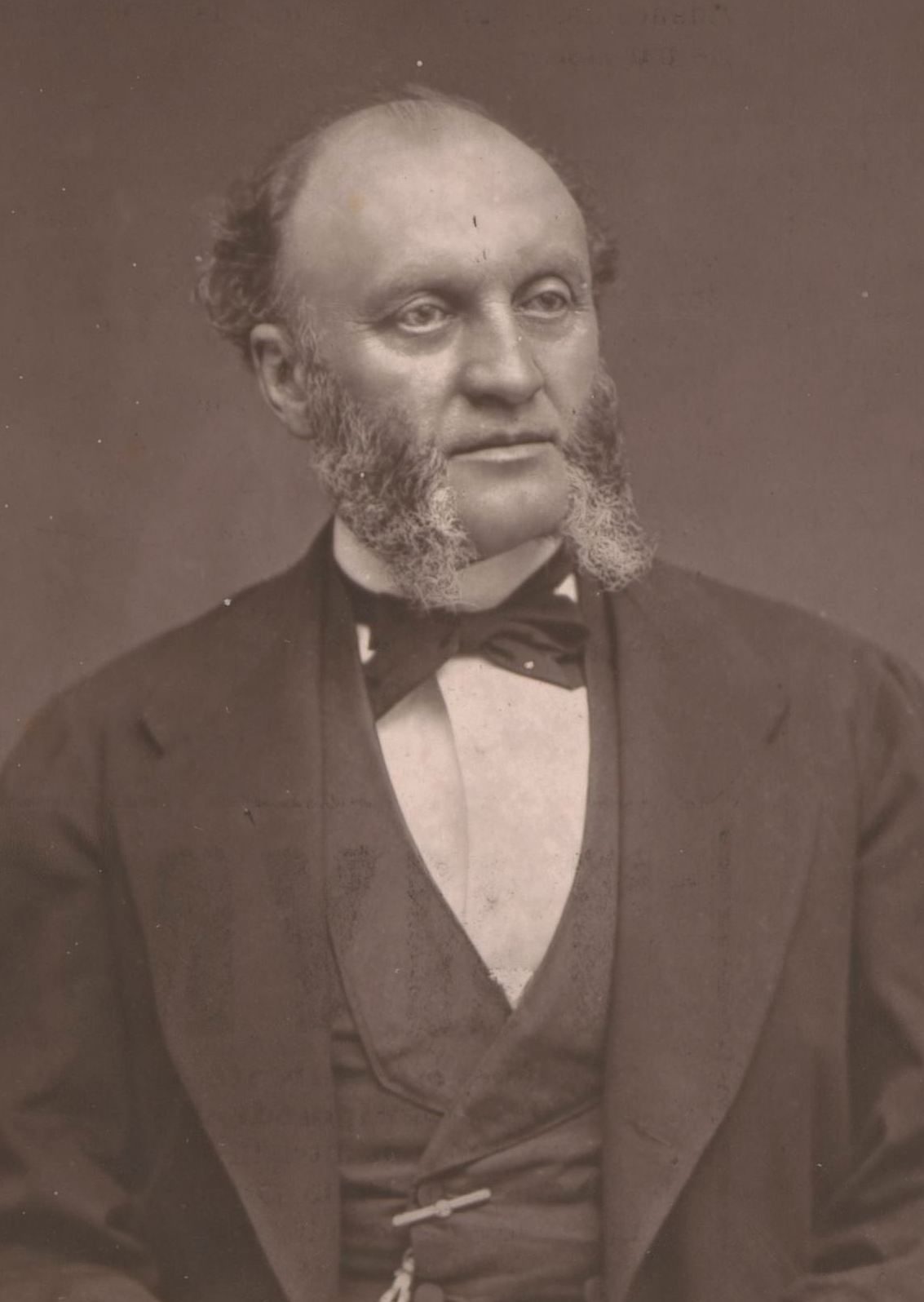
- Lepère c. 1879

Minister of the Interior and Religious Affairs
- In office 4 March 1879 – 17 May 1880
- Prime Minister: William Waddington; Charles de Freycinet
- Preceded by: Émile Deshayes de Marcère
- Succeeded by: Jean Antoine Ernest Constans

Minister of Agriculture and Commerce
- In office 4 February 1879 – 4 March 1879
- Prime Minister: William Waddington
- Preceded by: Pierre Teisserenc de Bort
- Succeeded by: Pierre Tirard

Under-Secretary of State for the Interior
- In office 19 December 1877 – 3 February 1879
- Prime Minister: Jules Armand Dufaure

Personal details
- Born: 1 February 1823 Auxerre, Yonne, France
- Died: 6 September 1885 (aged 62) Auxerre, Yonne, France
- Party: UR
- Occupation: Politician; lawyer; journalist

Edme Charles Phillipe Lepère (1 February 1823 – 6 September 1885) was a French politician, journalist and lawyer who served as the Minister of the Interior and Religious Affairs under Prime Ministers William Henry Waddington from 1879 to 1880. He previously served as Minister of Agriculture and Commerce from February to March 1879.

== Life and career ==
=== Early life and early political career (1823–1871) ===
Lepère was born on 1 February 1823 in Auxerre, Yonne. Lepère studied law in Paris and registered at the bar in his hometown.

Lepère became editor of the democratic newspaper, L'Yonne, and was also a member of the Auxere municipal council, where he was an opponent of the Imperial government. He was Mayor of Auxerre from 1870 to February 1871.

=== Political career and death (1871–1885) ===
==== Early career (1871–1877) ====
After the fall of the empire, Lepère was elected in the 1871 French legislative election on 8 February as Yonne's representative in the National Assembly as a member of the Republican Union. His biography from the dictionary of French parliamentarians written by Adolphe Robert and Gaston Cougny described him as one of the "most eager" members of the Republican Union to support the moderate policy of Adolphe Thiers. He spoke out against the return of the princes to France in June 1871, and defended the attacks on the right made by Léon Gambetta.

He was reelected in the 1876 French legislative election as Member for the 1st constituency of Auxerre by a majority of 9633 votes. In the 1877 election the following year, Lepère renewed his electoral mandate with a majority of 10218 votes.

==== Government career (1877–1880) ====
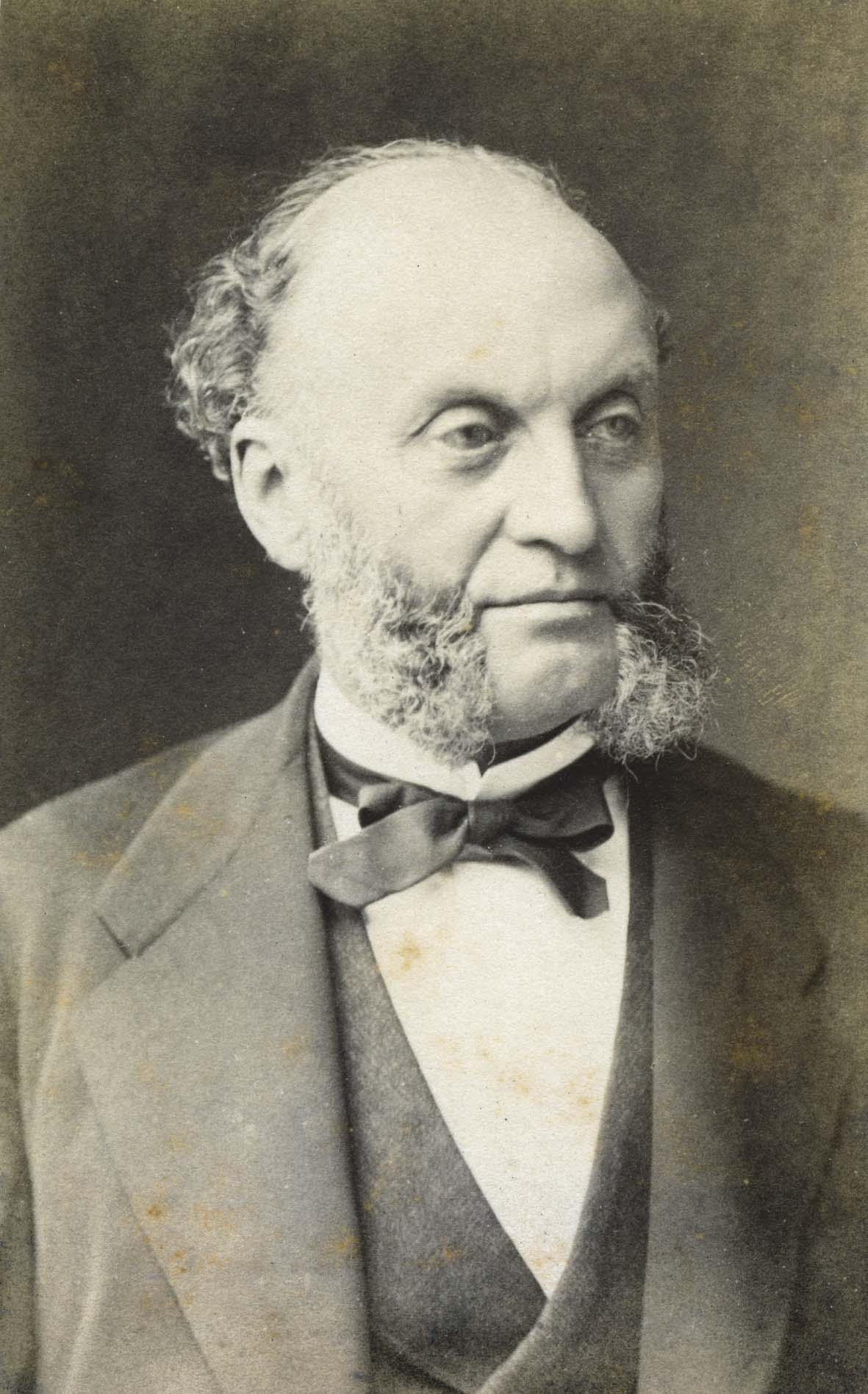
Lepère c. 1880

Lepère was appointed to the government of Prime Minister Jules Armand Dufaure on 14 December 1877 as Under-Secretary of State for the Interior. During his tenure, he was noted for his liveliness in the response to the opposition right-wing speakers. On 4 February 1879, shortly after the accession of Jules Grévy as president, Lepère was appointed Minister of Agriculture and Commerce.

On 4 March, a month after his appointment as Agriculture and Commerce Minister, Lepère was appointed Minister of the Interior and Religious Affairs. He retained his position after a cabinet reshuffle following the appointment of Charles de Freycinet as Prime Minister.

As Interior Minister, Lepère held a significant role in the expulsion of the Jesuits on 29 March 1880. The decrees, which required the Society of Jesus to be dissolved within three months, became questioned for its legality and was extremely controversial in both parliament and the press. In April 1880, he was questioned by Camille Godelle on the acts of Governor General of Algeria Albert Grévy, Lepère stated that he covered the acts under his responsibility. Lepère was involved in the first two deliberations of the bill, both of which were unsuccessful. The house rejected a proposal, before Lepère was successful in postponing periodic meetings or clubs. The second deliberation resulted in the resignation of Lepère, with article 10 being rejected by 250 votes to 126. The government rejected article 9 and demanded the maintenance of the original draft. The intervention of Freycinet was unsuccessful, and Lepère was replaced by his Under-Secretary of State,Ernest Constans.

==== Later career and death (1880–1885) ====
He was reelected in 1881 French legislative election on 21 August 1881. Lepère was prepared to seek reelection in the 1885 French legislative election, before his death on 6 September 1885 in Auxere due to erysipelas.
