= Paul Bastid =

French politician (1892–1974)

Paul Raymond Marie Bastid
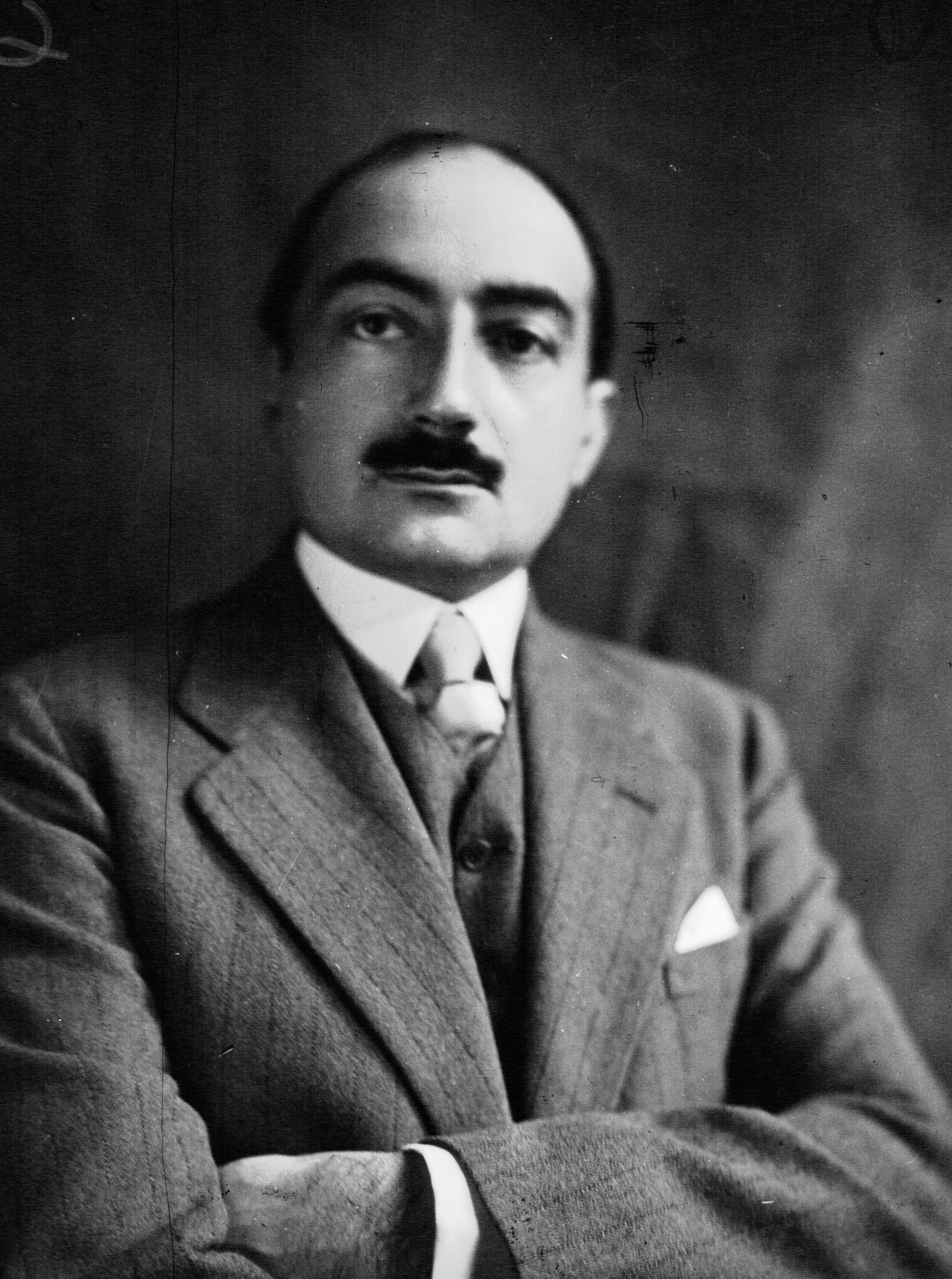
- Paul Bastid in 1932

Minister of Commerce
- In office 4 June 1936 – 22 June 1937
- Prime Minister: Léon Blum
- Preceded by: Georges Bonnet
- Succeeded by: Fernand Chapsal

Personal details
- Born: 17 May 1892 Paris 8e, France
- Died: 29 October 1974 (aged 82) Paris 7e, France
- Occupation: Lawyer, professor

Paul Raymond Marie Bastid (17 May 1892 – 29 October 1974) was a French lawyer, academic and radical politician who was a national deputy from 1924 to 1942 in the French Third Republic, and from 1945 to 1951 in the French Fourth Republic. He was Minister of Commerce from 1936 to 1937. During and after World War II (1939–45) he was involved in discussions about France's position in a future European federation. He was a prolific author on subjects that ranged from law and history to fiction and poetry.

== Early years (1892–1924) ==
Paul Raymond Marie Bastid was born on 17 May 1892 in the 8th arrondissement of Paris. His father and his grandfather, Adrien Bastid and Raymond Bastid, were both former deputies of Cantal. His maternal grandfather, Paul Devès, was a former deputy, senator and Minister. Paul Bastid attended the École Normale Supérieure, where he passed the agrégation examinations in philosophy and law, and became a Doctor of Letters. He was made a member of the Académie des Sciences Morales et Politiques and professor of the Faculty of Law of Paris. He wrote for various newspapers including La Dépêche de Toulouse and l'Ere nouvelle.

== Deputy (1924–39) ==
On 11 May 1924 Bastid was elected deputy for Cantal. He was secretary of the Chamber in 1925 and 1926. Bastid was extremely active in parliament, and was particularly interested in international affairs and in constitutional issues. In 1930 he was rapporteur of the General Arbitration Act. He was a member of the French delegation to the League of Nations for seven assemblies between 1926 and 1939. He was elected deputy for the constituency of Aurillac in the general elections of 22–29 April 1928. He retained that seat in the elections of 1–8 May 1932 and 26 April – 3 May 1936.

In 1934 he was also elected president of the General Council of Cantal, holding that office until 1941. He chaired the Foreign Affairs committee from 1934 to 1936. He was Minister of Commerce in the cabinet of Léon Blum from 4 June 1936 to 22 June 1937.

In 1937 Bastid married Suzanne Basdevant (born 1906). Her father was Jules Basdevant, a professor of public international law in Paris. She had studied law and obtained the doctorat en droit in 1930. Her thesis won the Goullencourt Prize. They had three daughters and a son, who died. Suzanne taught public international law at the law faculty of Lyon from 1933 to 1946, then became a professor of international law at the University of Paris and at the Institut d'études politiques de Paris (Paris Institute of Political Studies). She became a highly respected expert on international law.

== World War II (1939–45) ==
In 1941 Bastid was dismissed from his office as Councilor General by the Vichy government. Bastid became active in the French Resistance. At the start of the summer of 1942 Bastid circulated a document to many parliamentarians in which he asserted that Marshal Philippe Pétain had violated the mandate given him on 10 July 1940, and protested against the abuses of the Vichy government. He called for creation of a new government. Through the Bastids the Faculty of Law of Lyon became a center of resistance. In August 1942 Bastid wrote to General Charles de Gaulle recognizing him as head of France combattante (Fighting France). In 1943 he was a member of the National Council of the Resistance (Conseil National de la Résistance, CNR). When the Council drew up its programme for political reform after the Liberation in 1944, Bastid threatened to resign if it committed to granting the vote to women.

The Comité des Experts (Committee of Experts) was formed in June 1942 on the initiative of Jean Moulin. The committee became known as the General Studies Committee (Comité général d'études, CGE) from February 1943. Its purpose, confirmed by the CNR when it first met in May 1943, was to work out how France was to be run after Liberation. The members were Bastid, Robert Lacoste, François de Menthon and Alexandre Parodi. Pierre-Henri Teitgen was rapporteur for political questions and René Courtin was rapporteur for economic questions. In a report issued in April 1943 Bastid was skeptical about a collaborationist vision of Europe along the lines advocated by Vichy. Later the Committee was encouraged to explore the possibility of a European federation.

Bastid was a member of a committee of nine Radical politicians who met weekly from October 1943. The others were Hippolyte Ducos, Armand Dupuis, Laurent Eynac, André Isoré, Victor Pierre Le Gorgeu, Adolphe Landry, Marcel Plaisant and Pierre Mazé. In August 1944 Bastid occupied the Ministry of Foreign Affairs at the Quai d'Orsay in the name of the CNR, and directed it for several days pending the arrival of the government from Algiers. He was a member of the Provisional Consultative Assembly from 1944 to 1945, where he was president of the committee for reform of the state. After the Liberation of France he was director of the journal l'Aurore for several years.

== Later career (1945–74) ==
Bastid ran for Cantal on the platform of the Radical Socialist Republicans in the elections to the 1st National Constituent Assembly, but was defeated. In the elections to the 2nd National Constituent Assembly he was at the head of the list for the Rally of Left Republicans (Rassemblement des gauches républicaines) for the 2nd sector of the Seine department, and was elected. In the debates over the new constitution Bastid proposed indirect elections to the Senate by representatives of local collectives, which would favor the election of radicals.

Bastid was reelected to the National Assembly on the Rally of Left Republicans platform on 10 November 1946. In the legislature he was mainly concerned with questions of international relations, including the London Conference, the Council of Europe, ratification of the North Atlantic Treaty, Indochina and German rearmament. From 1949 to 1951 he led the group of liberals and radicals in the consultative assembly of the Council of Europe. Bastid and other Radical "Europeanists" such as René Mayer, Henri Queuille and Félix Gaillard advocated a pragmatic and gradualistic approach to the European Union. They hoped to make the European market as open as possible, but did not want to upset Radical opponents of a Federal Europe. They also wanted a probationary period before West Germany could join the Council of Europe.

Bastid failed to be reelected in 1951, and did not run for election in 1956. He was made a knight of the Legion of Honor and was awarded the Resistance Medal with rosette. Paul Bastid died on 29 October 1974 in the 7th arrondissement of Paris at the age of 82.

== Publications ==
Bastid was a prolific author on subjects that included the law, history, fiction and poetry, and contributed to many journals. His major works included Sièyes et sa pensée (1939, crowned by the Académie française), Doctrines et Institutions politiques de la Seconde République (1945, grand prix Gobert by the Académie française), Les institutions politiques de la monarchie parlementaire française (1954) and Le Gouvernement d'assemblée (1956).

- Paul Bastid (1916). De la fonction sociale des communautés taisibles de l'ancien droit (in French). Tours: P. Salmon. p. 222.
- Paul Bastid (1917). Université de Paris. Faculté de droit et des sciences économiques (ed.). L'Hypothèque grecque et sa signification historique. Thèse (in French). Tours: P. Salmon. p. 153.
- Paul Bastid (1928). La Question de l'Escaut et le différend Hollando-Belge (in French). Paris: A. Pedone. p. 24.
- Paul Bastid (1930). Les Aisances de voirie. Étude de doctrine et de jurisprudence (in French). Laval: Barnéoud. p. 68.
- Paul Bastid (1939). Sieyès et sa pensée (in French). Republished by Slatkine Reprints, Geneva 1978. Paris: Hachette. p. 654.
- Paul Bastid (1945). Doctrines et institutions politiques de la Seconde République (in French). Vol. 2. Paris: Hachette.
- Paul Bastid (1945). Le Florilège de Primus (in French). Lille: Janicot. p. 112.
- Paul Bastid (1945). Frédérique (in French). Paris: Flammarion. p. 260.
- Paul Bastid (1947). Ironies amoureuses (in French). Paris: Flammarion. p. 251.
- Paul Bastid (1948). Un juriste pamphlétaire: Cormenin, précurseur et constituant de 1848 (in French). Paris: Hachette. p. 279.
- Paul Bastid (1948). Quelques notes sur les Amériques (Extrait de 'l'Aurore', 1947) (in French). Paris: J. Tallandier. p. 150.
- Paul Bastid (1948). L'avènement du suffrage universel (in French). Paris: Presses universitaires de France. p. 76.
- Paul Bastid (1948). Académie des sciences morales et politiques. France (ed.). Notice sur la vie et les travaux de Edouard Jordan (1866-1946) (in French). Paris: impr. de Firmin-Didot. p. 11.
- Paul Bastid (1954). Les institutions politiques de la monarchie parlementaire française (1814-1848) (in French). Paris: Ed. du Recueil Sirey. p. 425.
- Paul Bastid (1956). Le gouvernement d'assemblée (in French). Paris: Ed. Cujas. p. 402.
- Paul Bastid (1956). La Lanterne magique (in French). Fontenay-le-Comte: P. et O. Lussaud frères. p. 130.
- Paul Bastid (1960). Cours de droit constitutionnel (in French). Paris: les Cours de droit. p. 508.
- Paul Bastid (1962). En marge des jours (in French). Paris: J. Grassin. p. 175.
- Paul Bastid (1962). Les Grands procès politiques de l'histoire. Les Temps et les destins (in French). Paris: A. Fayard. p. 399.
- Paul Bastid (1966). Benjamin Constant et sa doctrine (in French). Vol. 2. Paris: Armand Colin. p. 1107.
- Paul Bastid (1969). Proclus et le crépuscule de la pensée grecque. Bibliothèque d'histoire de la philosophie (in French). Paris: J. Vrin. p. 506.
- Paul Bastid (1970). Ailleurs (in French). Paris: J. Grassin. p. 304.
- Paul Bastid (1972). Ultima verba: poèmes (in French). Paris: Éditions de la Revue moderne. p. 300.

== Sources ==
- Andrieu, Claire (2014). "Le programme du CNR dans la dynamique de construction de la nation résistante". Histoire@Politique. 24 (3): 5. doi:10.3917/hp.024.0005.
- Béguec, Gilles Le; Duhamel, Eric (1993). La reconstruction du Parti radical, 1944-1948: actes du colloque des 11 et 12 avril 1991. Editions L'Harmattan. ISBN 978-2-7384-1966-8.
- Collectif (1992). "Bastid (Paul Raymond Marie)". Dictionnaire des parlementaires français de 1940 à 1958 (in French). Vol. 2. B. Paris: La Documentation française.
- Fonvieille-Vojtovic, Aline (1993). Paul Ramadier, 1888-1961: élu local et homme d'état. Publications de la Sorbonne. ISBN 978-2-85944-226-2.
- Gueslin, André (1994-01-01). Les facs sous Vichy: étudiants, universitaires et Universités de France pendant la Seconde Guerre mondiale : actes du colloque des Universités de Clermont-Ferrand et de Strasbourg - Novembre 1993 (in French). Presses Univ Blaise Pascal. ISBN 978-2-87741-068-7.
- Jolly, Jean (1960–1977). "Bastid (Paul Raymond Marie)". Dictionnaire des parlementaires français; notices biographiques sur les ministres, députés et sénateurs français de 1889 à 1940 (in French). Paris: Presses universitaires de France. ISBN 2-1100-1998-0.
- Lipgens, Walter (1985-01-01). Documents on the History of European Integration: Continental plans for European union, 1939-1945 (including 250 documents in their original languages on 6 microfiches). Walter de Gruyter. ISBN 978-3-11-009724-5.
- Lipgens, Walter; Loth, Wilfried (1988). Documents on the History of European Integration: The struggle for European Union by political parties and pressure groups in western European countries, 1945-1950. Walter de Gruyter. ISBN 978-3-11-011429-4.
- Salokar, Rebecca Mae; Volcansek, Mary L. (1996-01-01). Women in Law: A Bio-bibliographical Sourcebook. Greenwood Publishing Group. ISBN 978-0-313-29410-5.
