= Alfred Massé =

French lawyer, journalist and politician

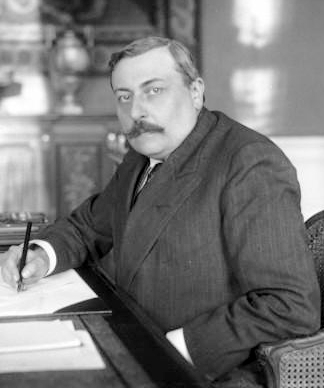
- Alfred Massé in 1913

Minister of Commerce and Industry
- In office 2 March 1911 – 27 June 1911
- Prime Minister: Ernest Monis
- Preceded by: Jean Dupuy (politician)
- Succeeded by: Maurice Couyba

Minister of Commerce, Industry, Posts and Telegraphs
- In office 22 March 1913 – 9 December 1913
- Prime Minister: Louis Barthou
- Preceded by: Gabriel Guist'hau
- Succeeded by: Louis Malvy

Personal details
- Born: 2 June 1870 Pougues-les-Eaux, Nièvre, France
- Died: 28 December 1951 (aged 81) Pougues-les-Eaux, Nièvre, France
- Occupation: Lawyer, journalist

Alfred Massé (2 June 1870 – 28 December 1951) was a French lawyer, journalist and politician who was twice Minister of Commerce and Industry shortly before World War I (1914–18).

== Early years ==
Alfred Louis François Pierre Massé was born on 2 June 1870 in Pougues-les-Eaux, Nièvre. He was the son of a former mayor of Nevers and former general councilor. His grandfather, also Alfred Massé, was a Senator for Nièvre. Massé became a lawyer and publicist. He edited La Tribune and contributed to Le Siècle, La Lanterne, and Le Rappel. He participated in conferences of the Union of Republican Youth, and in pro-democracy demonstrations in the Latin Quarter.

== Deputy and minister ==
On 22 May 1898 Massé was elected deputy for the first district of Nevers in the first round of voting, and sat with the Radical Socialist group. He was reelected on 11 May 1902, 6 May 1906 and 8 May 1910. He was rapporteur for the Finance Committee, and participated in all budget discussions. On 3 July 1905 he voted in favor of the complete bill for separation of church and state.

Massé was Minister of Commerce and Industry from 2 March 1911 to 27 June 1911 in the cabinet of Ernest Monis. He was elected vice-president of the Chamber of Deputies on 14 November 1911, and reelected on 9 January 1912. He resigned on 14 May 1913 after being appointed Minister of Commerce, Industry, Posts and Telegraphs from 22 March 1913 to 9 December 1913 in the cabinet of Louis Barthou. He lost his seat in the Chamber on 26 April 1914.

== Later career ==
During World War I Massé was involved in managing civilian supplies. In 1915 he wrote Le Troupeau français et la guerre (The French herd and the war) in which he argued in favor of industrial slaughterhouses in production centers. Massé was elected Senator on 11 January 1920, and sat on committees on Customs, Education and Agriculture. He failed to be reelected in January 1924. Alfred Massé died on 28 December 1951 in Pougues-les-Eaux.

== Publications ==
- Alfred Massé (1893). Un Acte de justice administrative. Mémoire et notes rédigés par M. Massé, relativement à une demande d'autorisation d'exploiter une source d'eau minérale située dans sa propriété à Pougues-les-eaux. Nevers: Mazeron frères. p. 31.
- Alfred Massé (1898). Les Forges de Guérigny et leurs adversaires. Preface by Maurice Cabart-Danneville. Nevers: J. Bellanger. p. 30.
- Alfred Massé (1910). "Les Partis politiques dans la Nièvre de 1871 à 1906". Les Cahiers nivernais et du Centre. 19. Paris: 88.
- Alfred Massé (1910). Le cinquantenaire du lycée de Nevers (in French).
- Alfred Massé (1913). Monographies nivernaises, canton de Pougues (in French).
- Alfred Massé (1915). Le Troupeau français et la guerre, viande indigène, viande importée. Preface by Jules Méline. Paris: Librairie agricole de la Maison rustique. p. 382.
- Alfred Massé (1938). Histoire du Nivernais. Les Vieilles provinces de France (in French). Paris: Boivin et Cie. p. 308.

== Sources ==
- Jolly, Jean (1960–1977). "Alfred, Louis, François, Pierre MASSÉ". Dictionnaire des parlementaires français de 1889 à 1940 (in French). Presses universitaires de France.
- La documentation française (2005). "Augustin LAURENT". Dictionnaire des parlementaires français de 1940 à 1958 (in French). Vol. 5. L-O. ISBN 2-11-005990-7.
- Lee, Paula Young (2008). Meat, Modernity, and the Rise of the Slaughterhouse. UPNE. ISBN 978-1-58465-698-2.
