= Émile Flourens =

French politician (1841–1920)

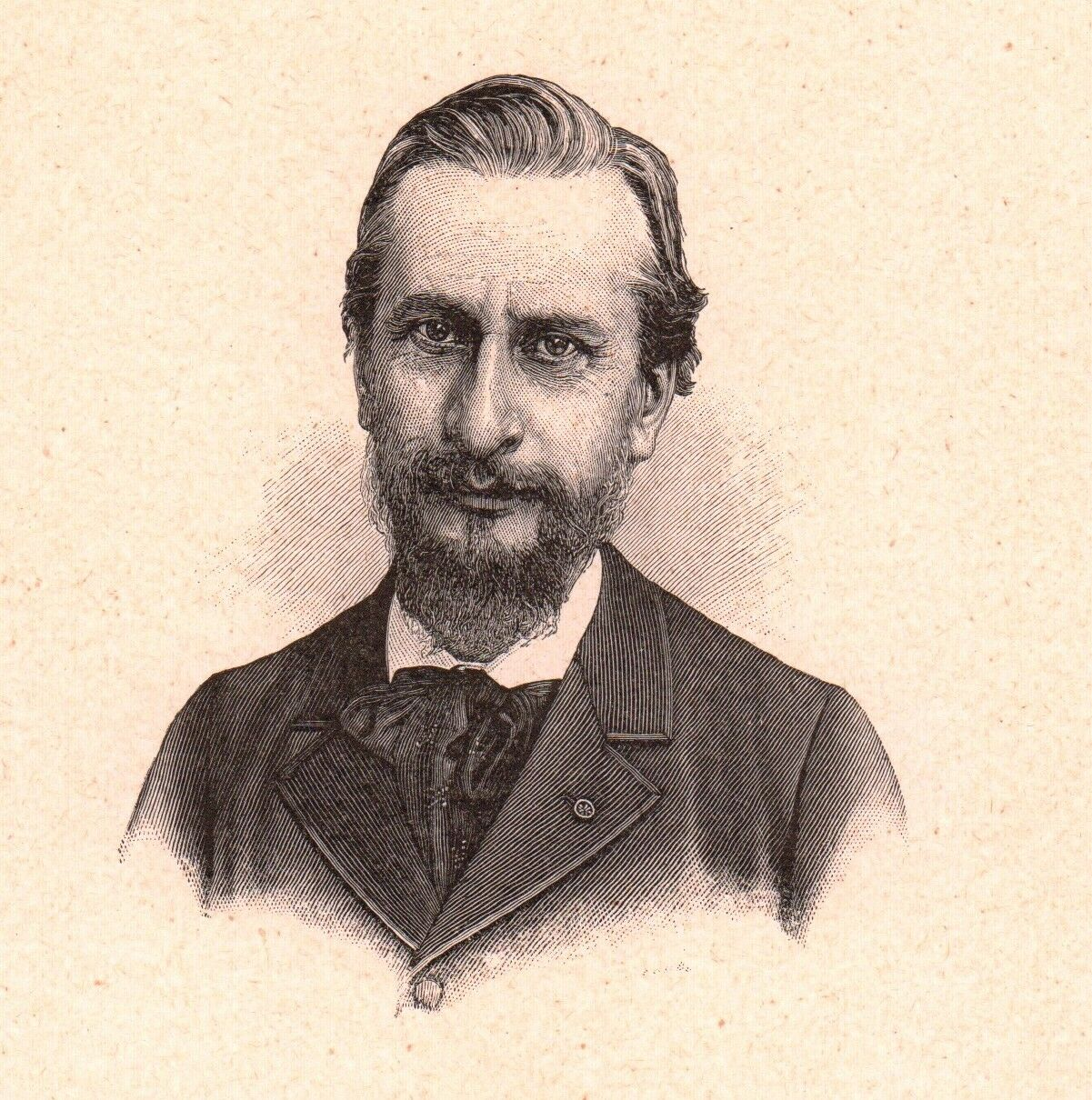

Émile Flourens (27 April 1841, in Paris – 7 January 1920) was a French politician, who was Minister of Foreign Affairs during the Third Republic. He was son of the biologist Jean Pierre Flourens, and the younger brother of Gustave Flourens, a general of the Paris Commune.

== Biography ==
He was auditor of the Imperial Council from 1863 to 1868, and in 1879 was appointed head of a department in the Ministry of Education, in which capacity he took part in all anti-clerical ordinances. In March 1885, he became president of the departments of Legislation, Justice, and Foreign Affairs in the Government Council, and president of the Deliberative Commission on French protectorates in the Ministry of Foreign Affairs.

=== Minister ===
In 1886 he became Minister of Foreign Affairs in the Goblet Cabinet. Following Jules Ferry's policy at the Quai d'Orsay, he maintained a pacific policy towards Germany, but sought to break the diplomatic isolation of republican France. France’s defeat by Prussia in 1870 had been followed by the defection of Italy to the Triple Alliance, inspired by colonial rivalry caused by French control of Tunisia, and by the increasingly strong hold of Pan-Germanism on the Austro-Hungarian monarchy.

Laying the foundations of the future Triple Entente, he began the policy of rapprochement with Great Britain and Russia, both of whose royal families had personal links with those of the Central Powers but whose interests were increasingly divergent with Germany. He also conducted French policy through a number of periods of diplomatic tension with Germany, the most serious of which was the Schnaebelé Affair, named after an official of Alsatian origin arrested in Germany on the charge of spying for the benefit of France in April 1887. He opposed, with the support of the President of the Republic Jules Grévy, the warmongering policy of the Minister of War, General Boulanger, who favoured replying to the alleged German provocation with an energetic manifesto, and risked war with Germany when France lacked any reliable ally.

Despite his own somewhat nationalistic feelings, Flourens was aware, like Grévy and Ferry, of the weakness of the country, and pursued a policy of avoiding war with Germany. In October 1887 he signed two agreements with the United Kingdom, on the Suez Canal and the New Hebrides, thus ending two possible areas of tension with France’s ally from 1904 onward.

Flourens retained his portfolio during the Rouvier and Tirard cabinets until April 1888.

== Theories ==
He criticized the Permanent Court of Arbitration and critiqued the premise on which the League of Nations and the World Court were founded, claiming there were freemasonic influences creating a world government, with judicial and religious functions, from which the possibility of submission to Papal authority would be excluded. He advocated that international law ought to remain arbitral, rather than judicial, in its execution, as it would otherwise cause more war, leading in due course to the vindication of the doctrine that might makes right, thereby ultimately replacing law by force: precisely what a judicial system of international law had sought to avoid. He suggested that freemasonic circles wished to eliminate the right of self-determination of peoples, replacing it with international law.

== Works ==
He published Organisation judiciaire et administrative de la France et de la Belgique de 1814 à 1875 (1875), for which a prize was awarded by the Academy.

Political offices
Preceded by Charles de Freycinet	Minister of Foreign Affairs; 1886–1888	Succeeded by René Goblet
