= Édouard Ramonet =

French politician (1909–1980)

Édouard Ramonet (14 June 1909, Cerbère – 4 August 1980) was a French politician. He represented the Radical Party in the Constituent Assembly elected in 1945, in the Constituent Assembly elected in 1946 and in the National Assembly from 1946 to 1958. He was Minister of Commerce and Industry from 1958 to 1959.
