= Eugène Spuller =

French politician and writer

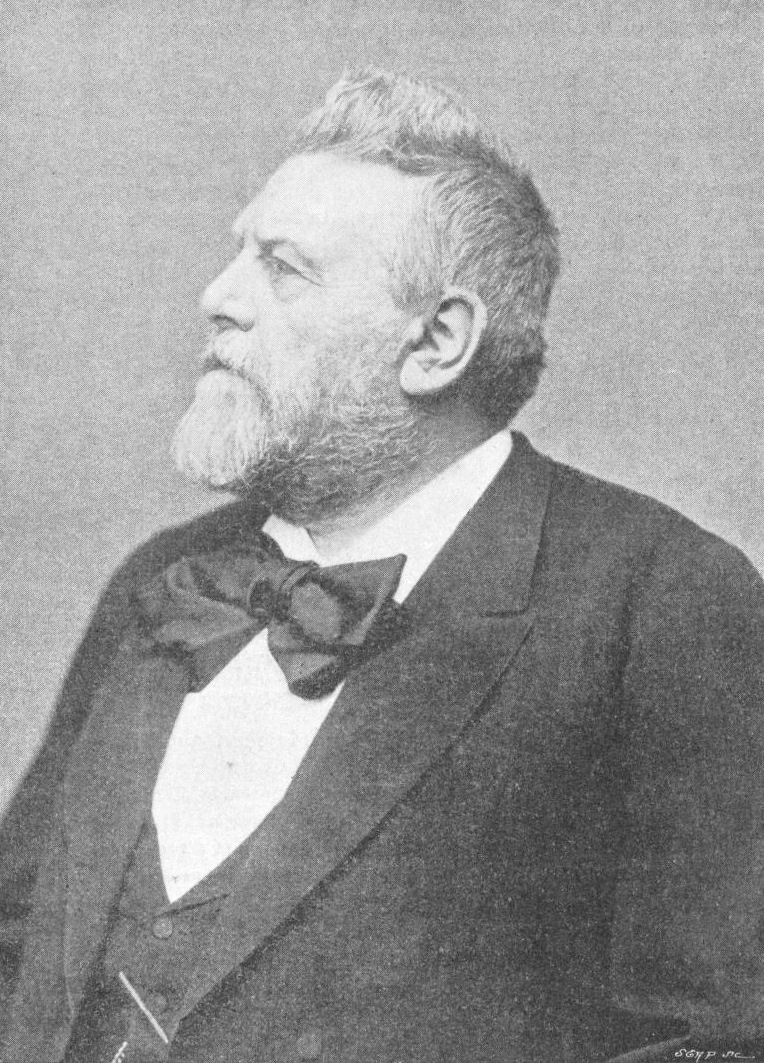
Spuller (Pierre Petit)

Eugène Spuller (8 December 1835 – 23 July 1896) was a French politician and writer.

Departure of Léon Gambetta and Eugène Spuller aboard the Armand-Barbès, 1870

He was born at Seurre (Côte-d'Or), his father being a German who had married and settled in France. After studying law at Dijon, he went to Paris, where he was called to the bar, and became close to Léon Gambetta, collaborating with him in 1868 in the foundation of the Revue politique. He had helped Emile Ollivier in his electoral campaign in Paris in 1863, but when in 1869 Ollivier was preparing to "rally" to the empire, Spuller supported the republican candidate. During the siege of Paris he escaped from the city with Gambetta, becoming his energetic lieutenant in the provinces.

After the peace he edited his chief's Parisian organ, La République française, until in 1876 he entered the Chamber of Deputies for the department of the Seine. He was minister of foreign affairs during the brief Gambetta administration, and subsequently one of the vice-presidents of the chamber, serving on the budget commission and on a special industrial and agricultural inquiry. His Parisian constituents thought him too moderate on the clerical question, and he had to seek election in 1885 in the Côte d'Or, which in later years he represented in the Senate.

He was minister of education, religion and the fine arts in Maurice Rouvier's cabinet of 1887; minister of foreign affairs under Pierre Tirard (1889–1890), and minister of education in 1894 in the Casimir-Perier cabinet. His published works include some volumes of speeches and well-known studies of Ignatius of Loyola (1876) and of Jules Michelet (1876).

== Statue of Liberty dedication ==
On 4 July 1884 Spuller and other members of the French Cabinet formally presented the Statue of Liberty to the United States.

Following the ceremony, the statue was dismantled into numbered sections and packed in 210 wooden cases and put aboard the government steamship 'Isère', which sailed on 21 May 1885 for New York City.

== Death and tomb ==
Spuller died in Sombernon on 23 July 1896 following a lengthy illness. Spuller's tomb in the Père Lachaise Cemetery in Paris is marked by a statue representing National Education, by sculptor Paul Gasq.

Political offices
Preceded by Marcelin Berthelot	Minister of Public Instruction and Fine Arts; 1887	Succeeded by Léopold Faye
Preceded by René Goblet	Minister of Worship; 1887	Succeeded by Léopold Faye
Preceded by René Goblet	Minister of Foreign Affairs; 1889–1890	Succeeded by Alexandre Ribot
Preceded by Raymond Poincaré	Minister of Public Instruction and Fine Arts; 1893–1894	Succeeded by Georges Leygues
Preceded by Raymond Poincaré	Minister of Worship; 1893–1894	Succeeded by Charles Dupuy
