= Jean-Baptiste Collin de Sussy =

French politician (1750–1826)

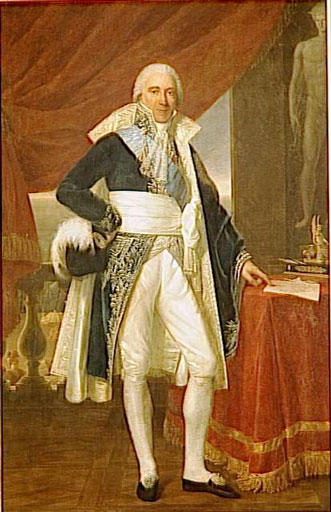
- 1813 portrait by Henri-François Riesener
- Born: 1 January 1750; Sainte-Menehould, Marne, France
- Died: 7 July 1826 (aged 76); Paris, France
- Occupations: Official and politician
- Known for: being Napoleon's Minister of Industry and Commerce

Jean-Baptiste Collin de Sussy (1 January 1750 – 7 July 1826) was a senior official and politician. During the First French Empire he was Director-General of Customs, then Minister of Industry and Commerce.

== Life ==
Collin de Sussy was the receiver of customs after 18 Brumaire, year VIII (9 November 1799). He was named prefect of the department of Drôme on 7 March 1800, then of Seine-et-Marne on 28 November 1800. He was then appointed to the Council of State and attached to the Finance section. He was involved in all the important improvements in the customs service. Napoleon noted his administrative ability and used him for special projects on several occasions. In 1804 at Mainz he liquidated the debts of four departments of the Rhine.

In 1805 he proposed to the legislative body a project for the general organization of the customs. He developed the plan, which was adopted, and later improved it. Napoleon appointed him director-general of customs and a lifetime member of the Council of State in 1807. Napoleon created the ministry of Ministry of Commerce & Manufacturing to make the ministry of the Interior more manageable. On 15 January 1812 Collin de Sussy was appointed the first Minister of Commerce and Manufacturing.

Collin left the office immediately after the fall of Napoleon in 1814. When the emperor returned from his exile on Elba he confirmed Collin as Minister of State, named him a peer of France and first president of the Court of Accounts. After the Hundred Days he returned to private life until 5 March 1819, when the king named him a peer of the kingdom.

== Death and legacy ==
Collin died in Paris on 7 July 1826. An 1813 portrait of him by Henri-François Riesener is held in the musée national du château de Versailles et des Trianons. His eldest son, Vicomte Collin de Sussy, fought with the armies of the Alps and of Italy as an engineer. His younger son, Louis, also fought in the Napoleonic war. After peace returned, both sons found positions in the administration.

== Distinctions ==
Distinctions included:

- Count of the Empire (letters patent of 16 April 1808)
- Peer of France (royal ordinance of 5 March 1819)
- Chevalier of the Legion of Honour (decree of 2 October 1803)
- Commander of the Legion of Honour (decree of 14 June 1804)
- Grand-officer of the Legion of Honour (decree of 30 June 1811)
- Grand cross of the Order of the Reunion (3 April 1813)
