= Fernand Chapsal =

French lawyer, administrator and politician

Minister of Commerce and Industry
- In office 23 June 1926 – 15 July 1926
- Prime Minister: Aristide Briand
- Preceded by: Charles Daniel-Vincent
- Succeeded by: Louis Loucheur

Minister of Commerce
- In office 22 June 1937 – 18 January 1938
- Prime Minister: Camille Chautemps
- Preceded by: Paul Bastid
- Succeeded by: Pierre Cot

Minister of Agriculture from
- In office 18 January 1938 – 13 March 1938
- Prime Minister: Camille Chautemps
- Preceded by: Georges Monnet
- Succeeded by: Georges Monnet

Personal details
- Born: 10 March 1862 Limoges, Haute-Vienne, France
- Died: 10 February 1939 (aged 76) Neuilly, Seine, France
- Occupation: Lawyer

Fernand Chapsal (10 March 1862 – 10 February 1939) was a French lawyer, administrator and politician who was Minister of Commerce in 1926 and in 1937–38, and Minister of Agriculture in 1938.

== Early years ==
Fernand Chapsal was born on 10 March 1862 in Limoges, Haute-Vienne. His family moved to Saintes, Charente-Maritime when his father was appointed principal of the college there. Chapsal obtained his secondary education in the Saintes college, then studied at the Faculty of Paris and became a Doctor of Law. Soon after he was appointed to the Audit Court of the Council of State. He was in turn an Auditor, Master of Requests and Deputy-Commissioner to the Government for litigation. He published a treatise of the procedure before the Prefecture Councils.

Chapsal was chief of staff of Louis Ricard, Minister of Justice in 1892 and 1898, and of Georges Trouillot, Minister of the Colonies in 1898. He also taught at the Paris Institute of Political Studies (Ecole des Sciences Politiques de Paris) and at the National Institute of Agronomy. He promoted the Mutual Credit of Agriculture (Crédit mutuel agricole). He was a member and then president of the French Exhibitions Committee, and was commissioner general of several of these events, including those of Liège (1905), Brussels (1910) and Berlin (1912).

During World War I (1914–18) Chapsal was responsible for civil supplies. As of May 1915 Chapsal was a member of the inter-ministerial Comité de restriction des approvisionnements et du commerce de l'ennemi, which looked into economic warfare possibilities. In 1916 Chapsal became interested in the possibility of obtaining meat from the neutral Netherlands. However, despite the advantage to France and corresponding loss to Germany, it was too late. All supplies had by now been committed to the British or Germans. For the results he achieved in the difficult civil supplies job Chapsal was given the Grand Cross of the Legion of Honour in 1919.

== Political career ==
In 1919 Chapsal was elected mayor of Saintes and councilor-general of Charente-Inférieure. On 17 July 1921 he was elected senator for Charente-Inférieure in a by-election following the death of Émile Combes. He joined the Democratic Left. He was a member of the Customs Committee until 1937, and was president of the committee from 1926. He was particularly interested in questions of agriculture and economics. He was Minister of Commerce and Industry from 23 June 1926 to 15 July 1926 in the cabinet of Aristide Briand. In August 1926 he was appointed French delegate to the Reparations Commission, replacing Louis Barthou.

Chapsal was reelected to the senate on 14 January 1930. In January 1937 he was elected vice-president of the senate. He was Minister of Commerce from 22 June 1937 to 18 January 1938 in the 3rd cabinet of Camille Chautemps. He was Minister of Agriculture from 18 January 1938 to 13 March 1938 in the 4th cabinet of Camille Chautemps. He was reelected to the senate on 10 January 1939.

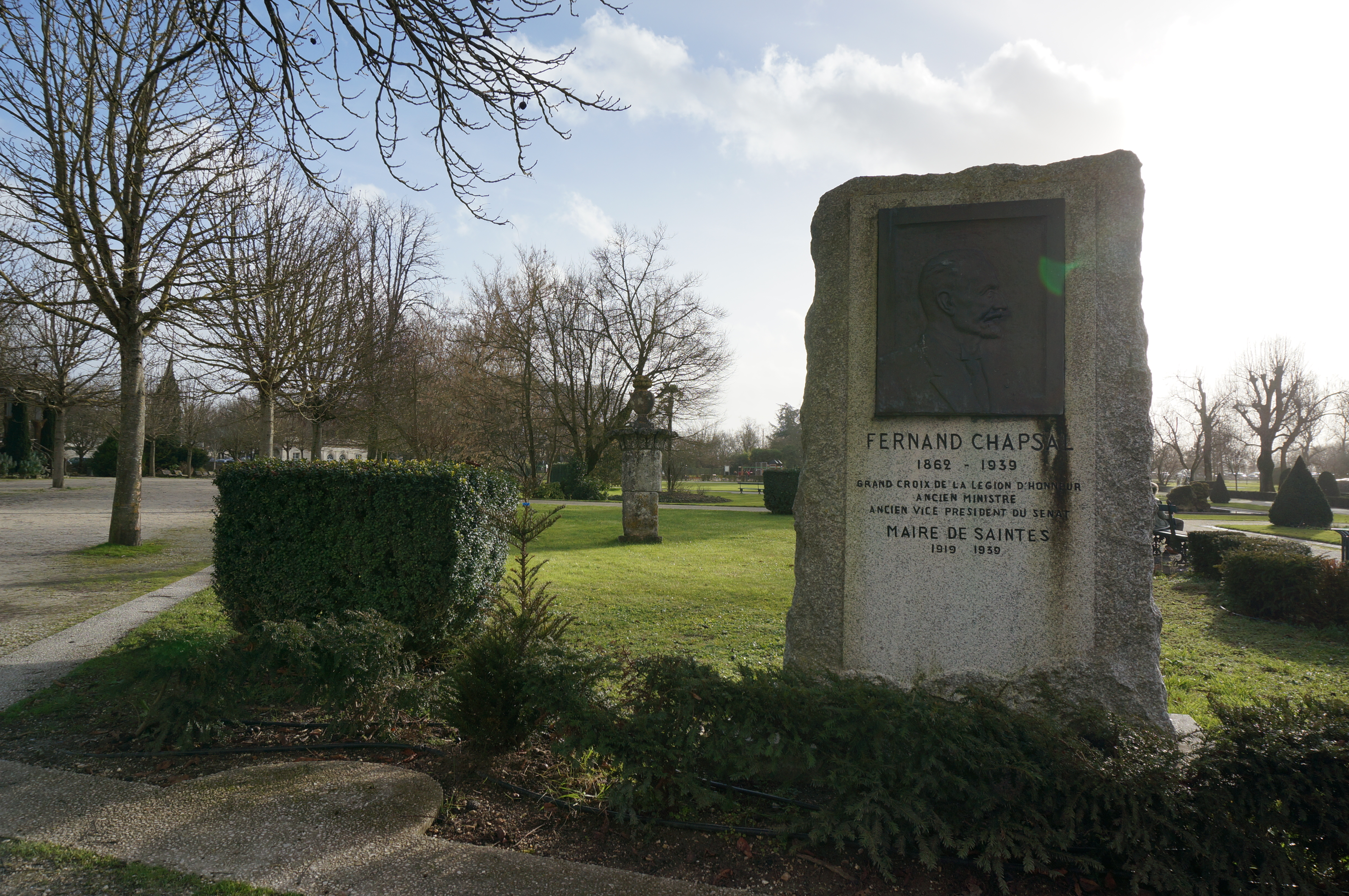
Monument to Chapsal in the public garden in Saintes

Fernand Chapsal died on 10 February 1939 in Neuilly, Seine, following a car accident. He was the grandfather of the author Madeleine Chapsal and the great-grandfather of the author Jérôme Hesse. A public garden and a road in Saintes were named after him.

== Publications ==
- Georges Tessier; Fernand Chapsal (1891). Traité de la procédure devant les conseils de préfecture, loi du 22 juillet 1889, décret du 18 janvier 1890 (in French). Paris: Marchal et Billard. p. 571.
- Georges Trouillot; Fernand Chapsal (1901). Le Contrat d'association, commentaire de la loi du Ier juillet 1901 (in French). Paris: bureaux des "Lois nouvelles". p. 504.
- Fernand Chapsal (1910). Exposition internationale. Section française (ed.). Exposition universelle et internationale de Bruxelles. Conférence faite par M. Chapsal,... à la Société de géographie commerciale, le 21 février 1911 (in French). Saint-Cloud, impr. de Belin frères. p. 39.
- Fernand Chapsal (1915). Intérêts économiques et rapports internationaux à la veille de la guerre, conférence... (in French). Paris.
- Fernand Chapsal (1926). Des sociétés à responsabilité limitée. leur régime d'après la loi du 7 mars 1925 (in French). Paris: Payot. p. 207.

== Sources ==
- Farrar, M.M. (2012-12-06). Conflict and Compromise: The Strategy, Politics and Diplomacy of the French Blockade, 1914–1918. Springer Science & Business Media. ISBN 978-94-010-1992-7.
- "Fernand CHAPSAL" (in French). Ministry of Agriculture, France. 2012-08-31. Archived from the original on 2018-05-19.
- Jolly, Jean (1960–1977). "Chapsal (Fernand)". Dictionnaire des parlementaires français; notices biographiques sur les ministres, députés et sénateurs français de 1889 à 1940 (in French). Paris: Presses universitaires de France. ISBN 2-1100-1998-0.
