= Fernand Dubief =

French politician (1850–1916)

Fernand Jean-Baptiste Dubief
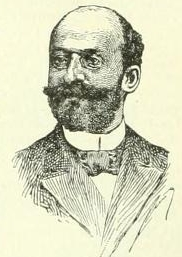

Minister of Commerce, Industry, Posts and Telegraphs
- In office 24 January 1905 – 12 November 1905
- Prime Minister: Maurice Rouvier
- Preceded by: Georges Trouillot
- Succeeded by: Georges Trouillot

Minister of the Interior
- In office 12 November 1905 – 14 March 1906
- Prime Minister: Maurice Rouvier
- Preceded by: Eugène Étienne
- Succeeded by: Georges Clemenceau

Personal details
- Born: 14 October 1850 Varennes-lès-Mâcon, Saône-et-Loire, France
- Died: 4 June 1916 (aged 65) Asnières-sur-Seine, Seine, France

Fernand Jean-Baptiste Dubief (14 October 1850 – 4 June 1916) was a French medical doctor and Radical politician who was Minister of Commerce, Industry and PTT in 1905 and then Minister of the Interior in 1905–06.

== Early years ==
Fernand Jean-Baptiste Dubief was born on 14 October 1850 in Varennes-lès-Mâcon, Saône-et-Loire. His father was a Republican and was deported after the 2 December 1851 coup by Napoleon III. Dubief received his secondary education in Mâcon. During the Franco-Prussian War of 1870 he served in the Armée de la Loire. He obtained a diploma as a doctor in 1875. Dubief was medical director of the lunatic asylum of Saint-Pierre in Marseille from 1886 to 1893, and later was superintendent of the Rhone asylum in Lyon. He became a Freemason, and sat on the Council of the Grand Orient, the central Freemasonry authority in France.

== Political career ==
In 1893, Dubief was elected mayor of Romanèche-Thorins and was also elected to the Saône-et-Loire departmental general council. In the general elections of 20 August 1893 he was elected in the first round as deputy for the first district of Mâcon. He sat with the Radical Republican and Radical Socialist group. Dubief supported strong measures against strikers. When a private bill was introduced in 1897 to grant amnesty to arrested strikers, Dubief wrote that the bill "would have no other result than to undermine the workings of justice, to the great damage of respect for the laws." Dubief was reelected in the general election of 8 May 1898. He was secretary of the assembly from 1898 to 1900. On 27 April 1902 he was reelected in a landslide.

In 1905, Dubief was chairman of the Radical Socialist group, president of the Commission du Travail, and regarded as an expert of labor issues. Under Maurice Rouvier he was Minister of Commerce, Industry, Posts and Telegraphs from 24 January 1905 to 12 November 1905. On 13 July 1905 Dubief presented a bill requiring ongoing vocational education in the workplace for young workers. This bill was eventually passed in 1919 under the name of Placide Astier. Dubief was responsible for a law that was approved on 8 October 1905 which established a special tariff of medical fees for accidents to working men.

After a cabinet reshuffle Dubief was Minister of the Interior from 12 November 1905 to 14 March 1906 under Rouvier and then Armand Fallières. During his ministry the separation of the church and state was adopted in December 1905 despite the strong opposition of Pope Pius X. He was succeeded as Minister of the Interior by Georges Clemenceau, the prime minister for the next three years. In 1906 Dubief was elected mayor of the commune of Prissé.

Dubief tried to make the point that the mentally ill were suffering from a disease, and should therefore be helped and protected by the state. Some of his statements reflected the poor state of understanding of the time. Thus he said in 1907 that epileptics should be isolated because people who were vulnerable to the disease might be infected by their cries. However, he also thought that an epileptic might not be mentally ill. Dubief lost his seat as deputy in the general elections of 1910 to a Radical Socialist opponent, but was reelected in the first round on 26 April 1914. Ferdand Dubief died at the age of 65 on 4 June 1916 in Asnières-sur-Seine, Seine.

== Publications ==
- Dubief, Fernand (1878). De l'inflammation chronique des follicules clos, (glande de Luschka) : de l'arrière-cavité des fosses nasales et de son traitement par la douche naso-pharyngienne : thèse pour le doctorat en médecine (in French). Paris: A. Parent. p. 63.
- Dubief, Fernand (1905). À travers la législation du travail (in French). Paris: É. Cornély & Cie. p. 273.
- Dubief, Fernand (1908). preface. Comment il faut prévenir et réprimer le vagabondage et la mendicité. By Langlais, Marc (in French). Paris-Tours : l'Écho littéraire et artistique. p. 47.
- Dubief, Fernand (1908). preface. Capital et travail devant les partis radicaux (républicains démocrates, radicaux, radicaux-socialistes, socialistes de gouvernement). By Molinié, Hector (in French). Carnot, Adolphe, preface. Coulommiers: Impr. de Buisine et Dessaint. p. 87.
- Combes, Émile; Vallé, Ernest; Dubief, Fernand (1909). Les dangers de la proportionnelle : discours prononcés au banquet d'union républicaine du lundi 20 décembre 1909 (in French). Bourgeois, Léon, preface. Auxerre: typogr. et lithogr. A. Gallot. p. 80.
- Dubief, Fernand (1909). Le régime des aliénés (in French). Baženov, Nikolaj Nikolaevic, preface. Paris: J. Rousset. p. 350.
- Dubief, Fernand (1909). preface. Pour protéger la santé publique. By Bernard, Marcel. Encyclopédie internationale d'assistance, prévoyance, hygiène sociale et démographie (in French). Paris: V. Giard & E. Brière. p. 282.
- Dubief, Fernand (1910). L'apprentissage et l'enseignement technique. Encyclopédie internationale d'assistance, prévoyance hygiène sociale et démographie (in French). Paris: V. Giard et E. Brière. p. 506.
- Dubief, Fernand (1911). La Question du vagabondage (in French). Paris: E. Fasquelle.

== Sources ==
- Day, Charles (2001-04-24). Schools and Work: Technical and Vocational Education in France Since the Third Republic. McGill-Queen's Press - MQUP. ISBN 978-0-7735-6895-2.
- "Dr. Fernand Dubief", The British Medical Journal, 2 (2900), BMJ: 167, 1916-07-29, doi:10.1136/bmj.2.2900.167-a, JSTOR 20304842, S2CID 220215541
- Ellis, Jack D. (1990-09-28), The Physician-Legislators of France: Medicine and Politics in the Early Third Republic, 1870-1914, Cambridge University Press, ISBN 978-0-521-38208-3
- Jolly, Jean (1960–1977). "Dubief (Fernand Jean-Baptiste)". Dictionnaire des parlementaires français; notices biographiques sur les ministres, députés et sénateurs français de 1889 à 1940 (in French). Paris: Presses universitaires de France. ISBN 2-1100-1998-0.
- "Medical Ministers In France", The British Medical Journal, 1 (2301), BMJ: 264, February 1905, JSTOR 20283809
