= Serge Papin =

French business executive and politician (born 1955)

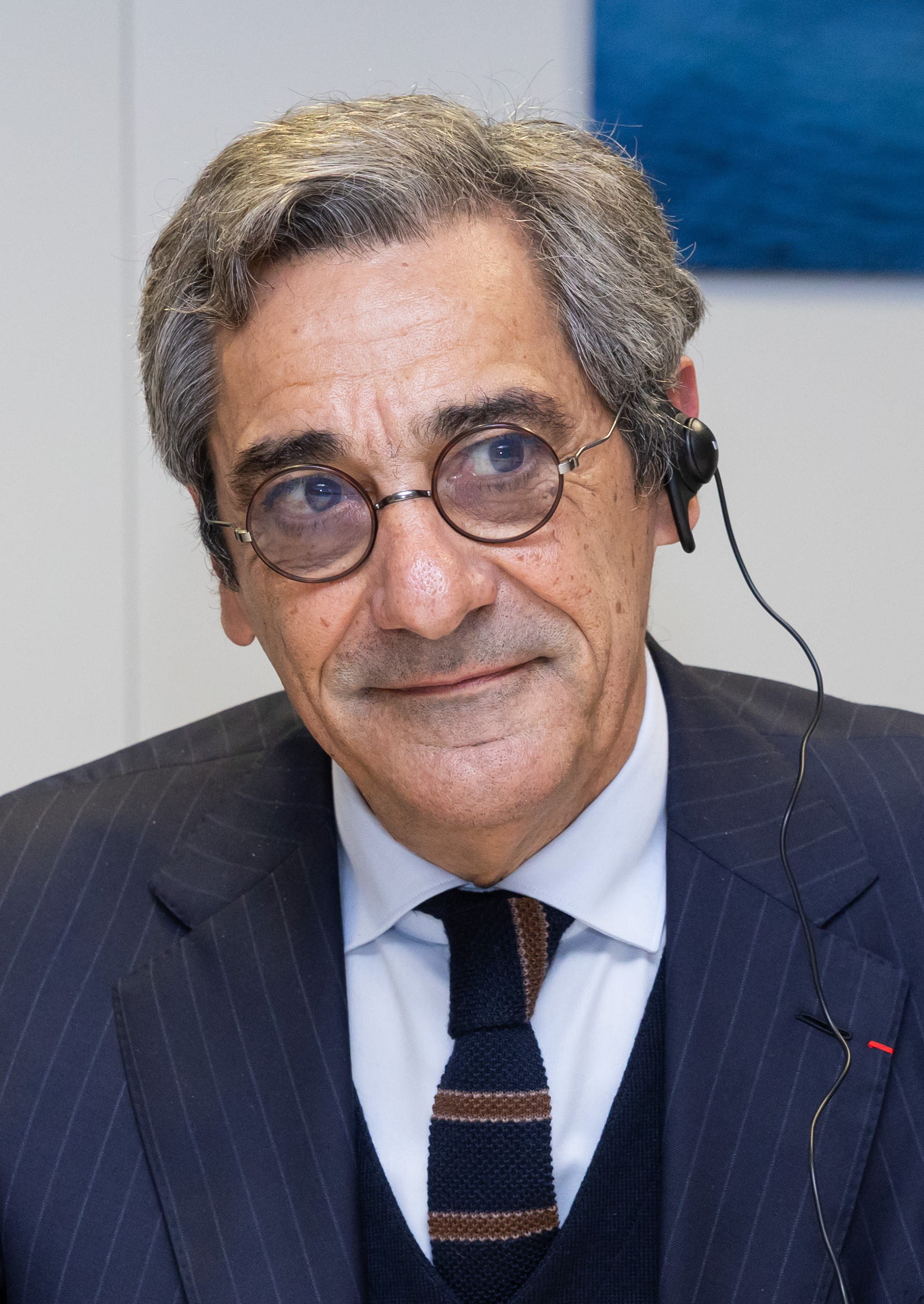
- Papin in 2025

Minister of Small and Medium-sized Enterprises, Trade, Crafts, Tourism and Purchasing Power
- Incumbent
- Assumed office 12 October 2025
- Prime Minister: Sébastien Lecornu
- Preceded by: Office established

Personal details
- Born: Serge Gérard Christian Papin; 1 August 1955 (age 70) Saint-Gilles-Croix-de-Vie, France
- Party: Independent
- Children: 5

Serge Gérard Christian Papin (French pronunciation: [sɛʁʒ(ə) papɛ̃]; born 1 August 1955) is a French business executive and politician. He was chairman and CEO of the cooperative retail group Système U from 2005 to 2018. He is known for promoting sustainable business practices and for launching the manifesto Osons Demain, pour la transition écologique des entreprises. In 2024, he became non-executive chairman of Auchan France, and in 2025, he was appointed Minister for Small and Medium Enterprises, Trade, Crafts, Tourism and Purchasing Power in Sébastien Lecornu's second government.

== Biography ==
=== Early life and education ===
Serge Gérard Christian Papin was born to Jean Papin and Madeleine Duranteau, both grocers. His family ran a store in La Châtaigneraie, Vendée. He studied at the Saint-Joseph College in Fontenay-le-Comte, later completing vocational studies in accounting and commerce. He holds a BEP in Commerce.

=== Career ===
Papin began his career in retail in 1972 as a warehouse worker at an Intermarché in Fontenay-le-Comte. In 1976, he joined Système U Ouest, where he created its communications department and later managed the Super U store in Chantonnay, which he bought in 1989.

He rose through the ranks of the cooperative, becoming regional vice-president in 1997 and CEO of Système U Ouest in 1998. In 2005, he was appointed CEO of Système U National, leading the group’s modernization, marketing strategy, and ecological initiatives such as the Écovalor recycling project.

He left Système U in 2018, succeeded by Dominique Schelcher, after forging an alliance with Carrefour to strengthen negotiation power with suppliers.

=== Later activities ===
After leaving Système U, Papin worked as a consultant, author, and public speaker on ecological and social transitions in retail. In 2024, he became non-executive chairman of Auchan France.

=== Political career ===
On 12 October 2025, Serge Papin was appointed Minister for Small and Medium Enterprises, Trade, Crafts, Tourism, and Purchasing Power in Sébastien Lecornu's second government.

== Personal life ==
Papin has four daughters from his first marriage and one son, born in 2010, from his second.

== Honours ==
He was made an Officer of the National Order of Merit on 24 November 2021.
