= Lucien Dautresme =

French politician

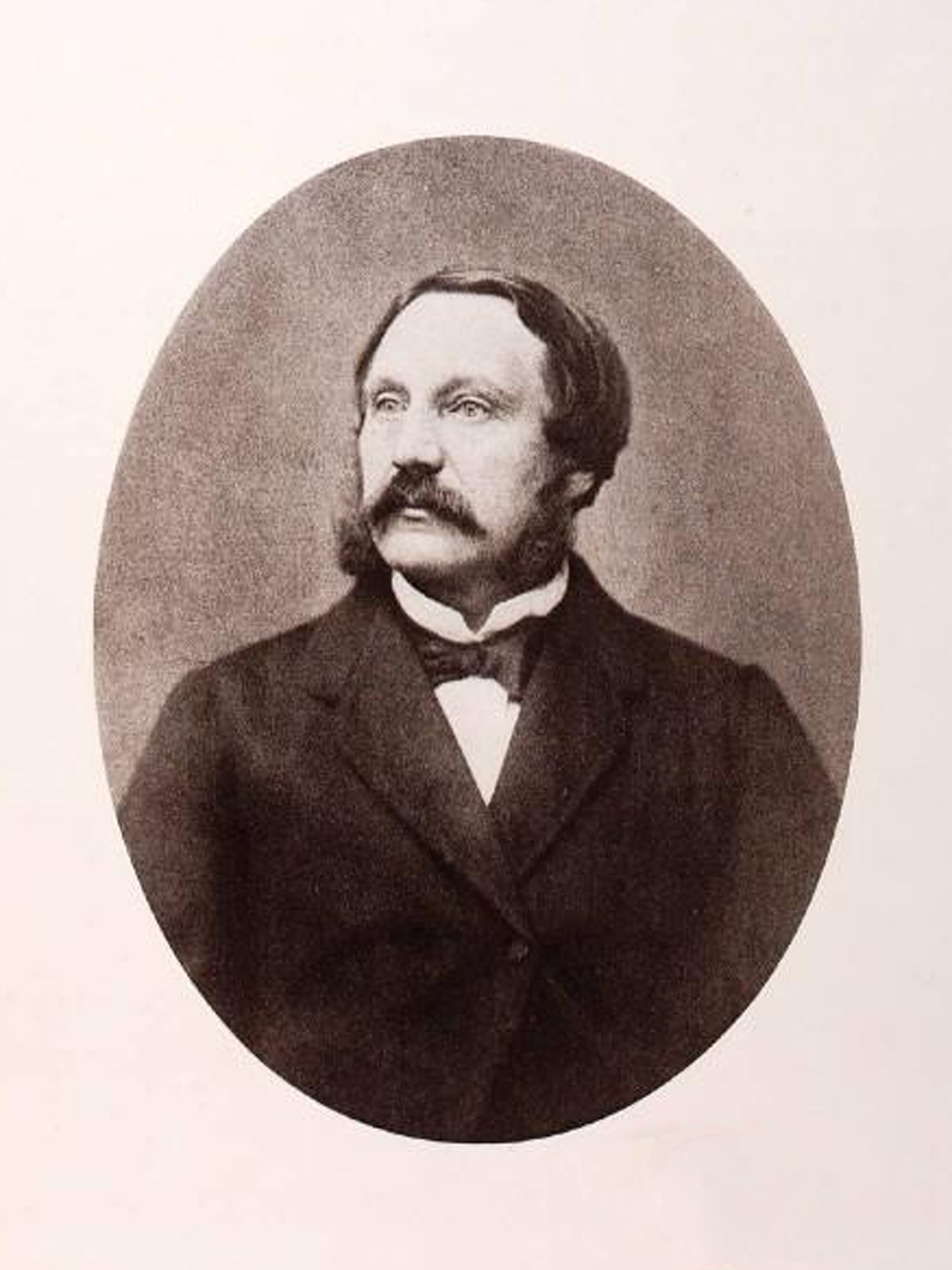

Lucien Dautresme (21 May 1826 – 18 February 1892) was a French politician of the French Third Republic. He was minister of commerce (9 November 1885 – 6 January 1886) in the government of Henri Brisson and minister of commerce and industry (30 May 1887 – 2 April 1888) in the government of Maurice Rouvier and Pierre Tirard. He was a member of the Chamber of Deputies of France from 1876 to 1891 and the Senate of France from 1891 until his death.

== Bibliography ==
- Chaline, Jean-Pierre; Sohn, Anne-Marie (2000). Dictionnaire des parlementaires de Haute-Normandie 1871-1940 (in French). Publications de l'Université de Rouen. pp. 103–105. ISBN 2-87775-294-1.
- "Lucien Dautresme", in Adolphe Robert and Gaston Cougny, Dictionnaire des parlementaires français (1789-1891), Bourloton, Paris, 1889 Edition details Wikisource
- « Lucien Dautresme », dans le Dictionnaire des parlementaires français (1889-1940), sous la direction de Jean Jolly, PUF, 1960.
