= Jean-Baptiste Bienvenu-Martin =

French politician (1847–1943)

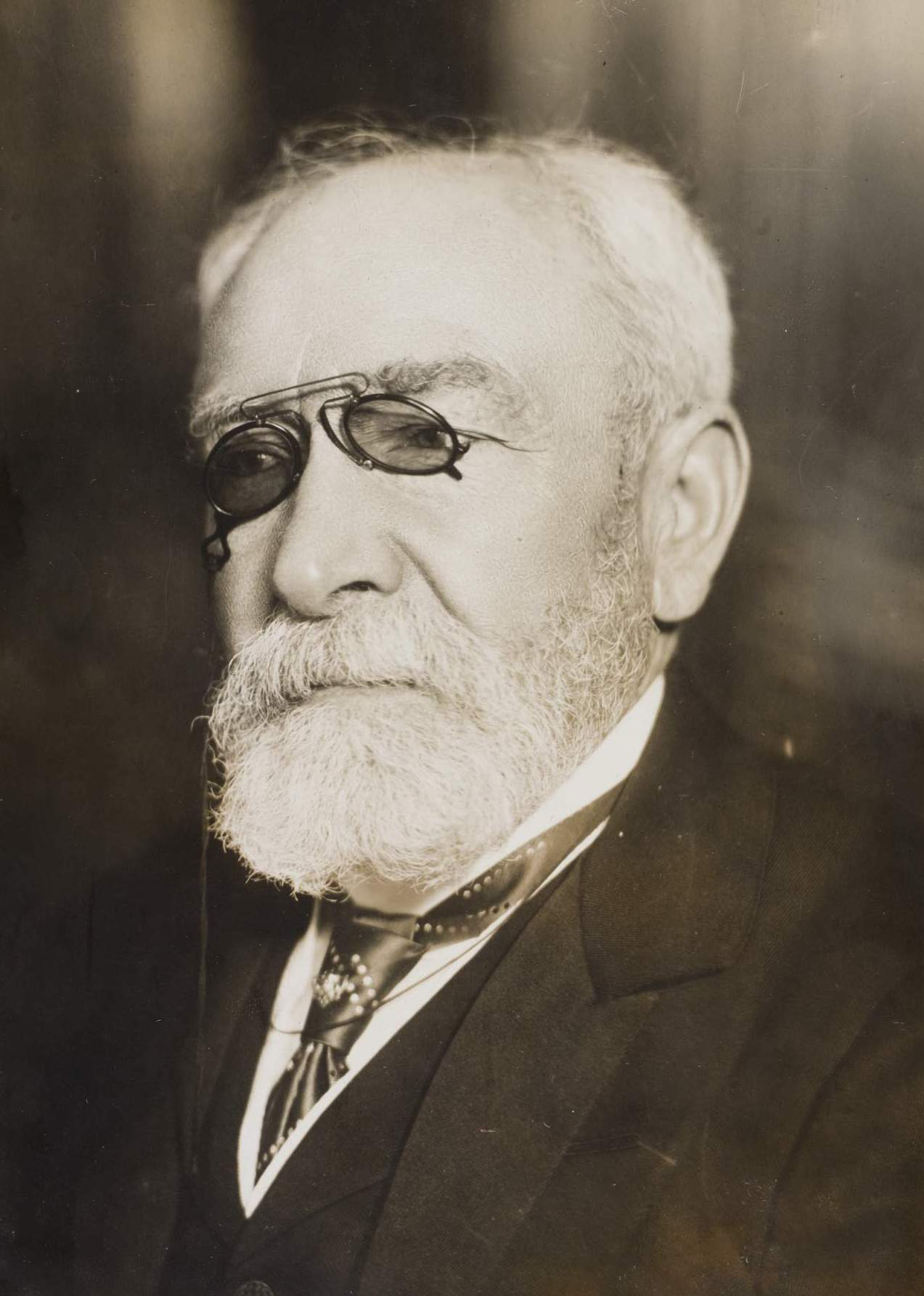
Jean-Baptiste Bienvenu-Martin in 1914

Jean-Baptiste Bienvenu Martin (22 July 1847 – 10 December 1943) was a French Radical leader and cabinet officer. He was born at Saint-Bris-le-Vineux (Yonne), and was educated in the law.

== Career ==
He held an under prefecture, entered the Council of State, and in 1894 became director under the Minister of the Colonies. He was an unsuccessful senatorial candidate for Yonne in 1897, was elected deputy for Auxerre in that year, was reelected in 1898 and 1902, and in 1905 became Senator for Yonne. In the Chamber he supported the Waldeck-Rousseau and the Combes ministries, and advocated the separation of church and state.

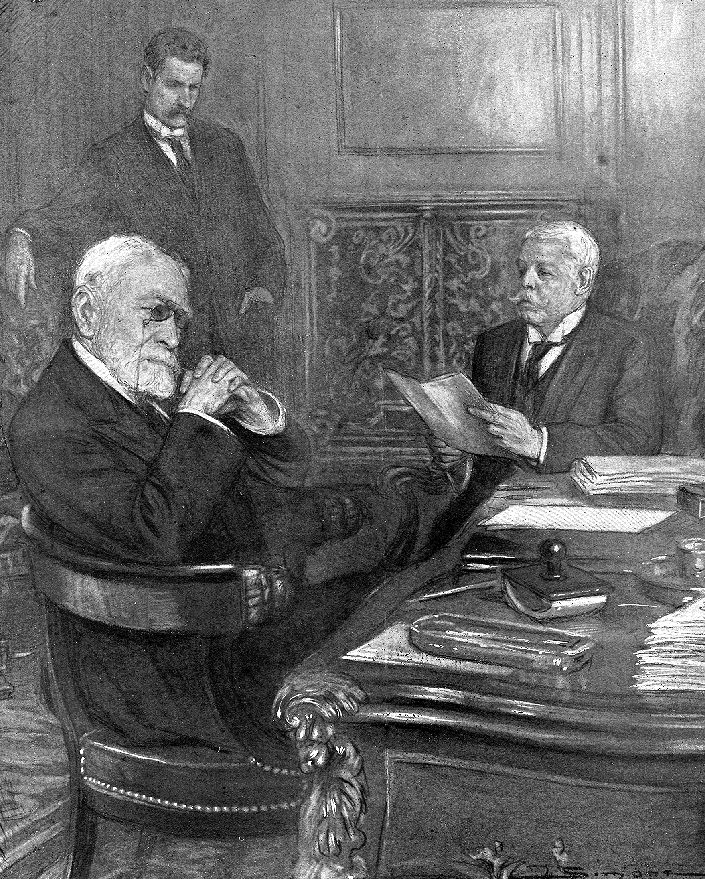
Jean-Baptiste Bienvenu-Martin, Philippe Berthelot and Wilhelm von Schoen. Baron von Schoen reads to M. Bienvenu-Martin, who is assuring interim for Foreign Affairs, a communication from his government backing Austria and declaring that is the conflict does not remain localised, "the most serious consequences" are to be feared.

In 1904 he became the leader of the new Radical group of the Left. In 1905-06 he held the portfolio of Public Instruction in the Rouvier cabinet; he was Minister of Justice in the Doumergue cabinet in 1913–14, and in the first cabinet organized by René Viviani in June, 1914; and when the War in Europe broke out in 1914, he became Minister of Labor in the second Viviani cabinet, formed August 26 of that year.

He died on December 10, 1943, at Saint-Bris.

Preceded by Antony Ratier	Minister of Justice; 1913–1914	Succeeded by Alexandre Ribot
Preceded by Alexandre Ribot	Minister of Justice; 1914	Succeeded by Aristide Briand
