= Pierre Tirard =

French politician

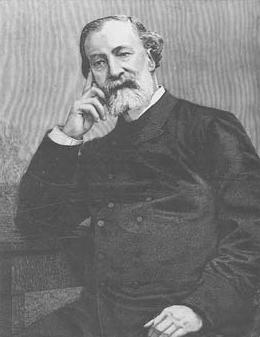

Prime Minister of France
- In office 22 February 1889 – 17 March 1890
- President: Sadi Carnot
- Preceded by: Charles Floquet
- Succeeded by: Charles de Freycinet
- In office 12 December 1887 – 3 April 1888
- President: Sadi Carnot
- Preceded by: Maurice Rouvier
- Succeeded by: Charles Floquet

Personal details
- Born: 27 September 1827 Geneva
- Died: 4 November 1893 (aged 66) Paris
- Party: None

Pierre Emmanuel Tirard (French: [pjɛʁ emanɥɛl tiʁaʁ]; 27 September 1827 – 4 November 1893) was a French politician, who served twice as Prime Minister during the Third Republic.

== Biography ==
He was born to French parents in Geneva, Switzerland. After studying in his native town, Tirard became a civil engineer. After five years of government service he resigned to become a jewel merchant. His determined opposition to the empire, culminating in 1869 in a campaign in favour of the radical candidate opposed to Ollivier, was rewarded by his election as mayor of the 11th arrondissement of Paris and as deputy for the Seine. Nominated a member of the Commune, he protested against the tyranny of the central committee, and escaped from Paris to resume his place among the extreme Left in the National Assembly at Versailles.

In 1876 he was returned for the 1st arrondissement of Paris to the Chamber of Deputies, and was re-elected next year. He specially devoted himself to finance, being for a short time president of the customs commission before his appointment as minister of agriculture and commerce in March 1879 in the Waddington cabinet. He held the same portfolio in the first Freycinet ministry (1879–1880) and in the Jules Ferry cabinet (1880–1881). He was minister of commerce in Freycinet's second cabinet (1882), of finance under E Duclerc (1882–1883), and under A Fallières (1883), retaining the same office in the second Jules Ferry ministry (1883–1885).

When Carnot became president of the Republic in 1887 he asked Tirard to form a ministry. He had to deal with the Wilson scandal which had led to President Jules Grévy's downfall, and with the revisionist agitation of General Boulanger. His refusal to proceed to the revision of the constitution of 1875 led to his defeat on 30 March 1888. He returned to power next year, and decided to bring Boulanger and his chief supporters before the High Court, but the general's flight effectively settled the question. He also arrested Philippe, Duke of Orleans, who had visited France in disguise. He resigned office on 15 March 1890 on the question of the Franco-Turkish commercial treaty. He replaced Maurice Rouvier in Alexandre Ribot's cabinet (1892–1893) as minister of finance, and died in Paris.

During his premiership, two laws aimed at promoting child welfare were introduced.

== Tirard’s 1st Ministry, 12 December 1887 – 3 April 1888 ==
- Pierre Tirard – President of the Council and Minister of Finance
- Émile Flourens – Minister of Foreign Affairs
- François Auguste Logerot – Minister of War
- Ferdinand Sarrien – Minister of the Interior
- Armand Fallières – Minister of Justice
- François de Mahy – Minister of Marine and Colonies
- Leopold Faye – Minister of Public Instruction, Fine Arts, and Worship
- Jules Viette – Minister of Agriculture
- Émile Loubet – Minister of Public Works
- Lucien Dautresme – Minister of Commerce and Industry

Changes

- 5 January 1888 – Jules François Émile Krantz succeeds Mahy as Minister of Marine and Colonies

== Tirard’s 2nd Ministry, 22 February 1889 – 17 March 1890 ==
- Pierre Tirard – President of the Council and Minister of Commerce and Industry
- Eugène Spuller – Minister of Foreign Affairs
- Charles de Freycinet – Minister of War
- Ernest Constans – Minister of the Interior
- Maurice Rouvier – Minister of Finance
- François Thévenet – Minister of Justice and Worship
- Benjamin Jaurès – Minister of Marine and Colonies.
- Armand Fallières – Minister of Public Instruction and Fine Arts
- Léopold Faye – Minister of Agriculture
- Yves Guyot – Minister of Public Works

Changes

- 14 March 1889 – Jules François Émile Krantz succeeds Jaurès as Minister of Marine. Premier Tirard becomes Minister of the Colonies, in addition to Minister of Commerce and Industry.
- 10 November 1889 – Édouard Barbey succeeds Krantz as Minister of Marine.
- 1 March 1890 – Léon Bourgeois succeeds Constans as Minister of the Interior

Political offices
Preceded by Maurice Rouvier	Prime Minister of France; 1887–1888	Succeeded by Charles Floquet
Preceded by Charles Floquet	Prime Minister of France; 1889–1890	Succeeded by Charles de Freycinet
