= Charles Floquet =

French lawyer and statesman (1828–1896)

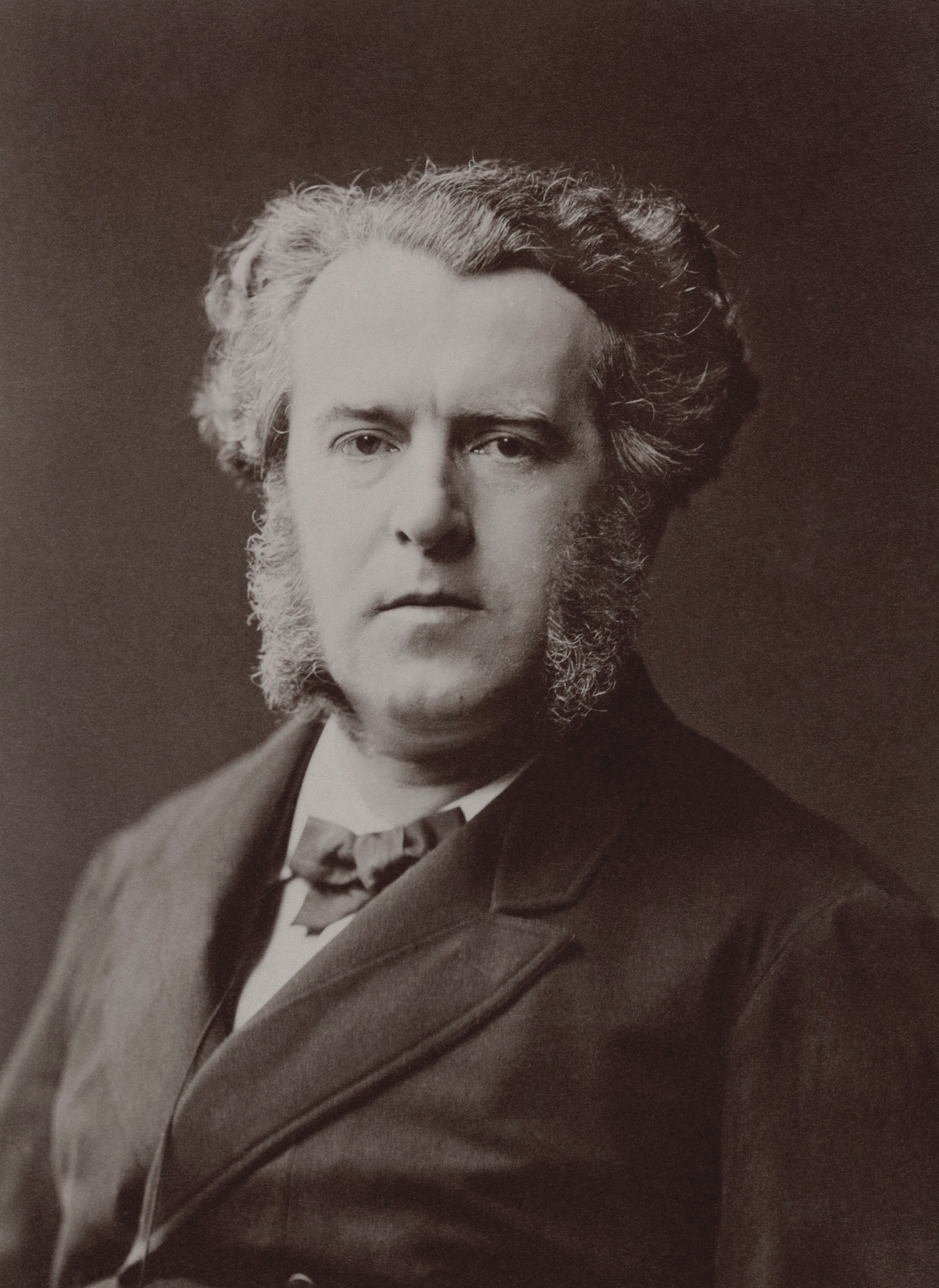
- Photograph c. 1870

Prime Minister of France
- In office 3 April 1888 – 22 February 1889
- President: Sadi Carnot
- Preceded by: Pierre Tirard
- Succeeded by: Pierre Tirard

Personal details
- Born: 2 October 1828
- Died: 18 January 1896 (aged 67)
- Party: Republican Union
- Spouse: Hortense Kestner

Charles Thomas Floquet (French: [ʃaʁl tɔma flɔkɛ]; 2 October 1828 – 18 January 1896) was a French lawyer and statesman.

== Biography ==
He was born at Saint-Jean-Pied-de-Port (Basses-Pyrénées). Charles Floquet is the son of Pierre Charlemagne Floquet and Marie Léocadie Etcheverry, daughter of Thomas Etcheverry, Deputy Mayor of Saint-Étienne-de-Baïgorry, and Marthe Harismendy. In 1869 he married Hortense Kestner, born 31 may 1840 in Thann (Haut-Rhin), died in 1913 in Rueil-Malmaison (Hauts-de-Seine), daughter of Charles Kestner, chemist, industrialist and politician. He studied law in Paris, and was called to the bar in 1851. The coup d'état of that year aroused the strenuous opposition of Floquet, who had, while yet a student, given proof of his republican sympathies by taking part in the fighting of 1848. He made his name by his brilliant and fearless attacks on the government in a series of political trials, and at the same time contributed to the Temps and other influential journals. He delivered a scathing indictment of the Empire at the trial of Pierre Bonaparte for killing Victor Noir in 1870, and took a part in the revolution of 4 September as well as in the subsequent defence of Paris.

There is controversy regarding an episode that took place at the Palais de Justice in June 1867 when Russian Emperor Alexander II had visited the institution in Paris. Many insist that Charles Floquet said to the Tzar: "Vive la Pologne, Monsieur!", which was an extremely impolite way of addressing a monarch. As Charles Floquet said himself, he had only said "Vive la Pologne!", and when the Tzar turned his head, Maurice Joly, a fellow lawyer of the Paris Bar, had said: "Oui, Vive la Pologne, monsieur!"

In 1871 he was elected to the National Assembly by the département of the Seine. During the Commune, he formed the Ligue d’union républicaine des droits de Paris to attempt a reconciliation with the government of Versailles. When his efforts failed, he left Paris and was imprisoned by order of Thiers, but soon released. He became editor of the Republique Française, was chosen president of the municipal council, and in 1876 was elected deputy for the eleventh arrondissement. He took a prominent place among the extreme radicals, and became president of the group of the "Union républicaine."

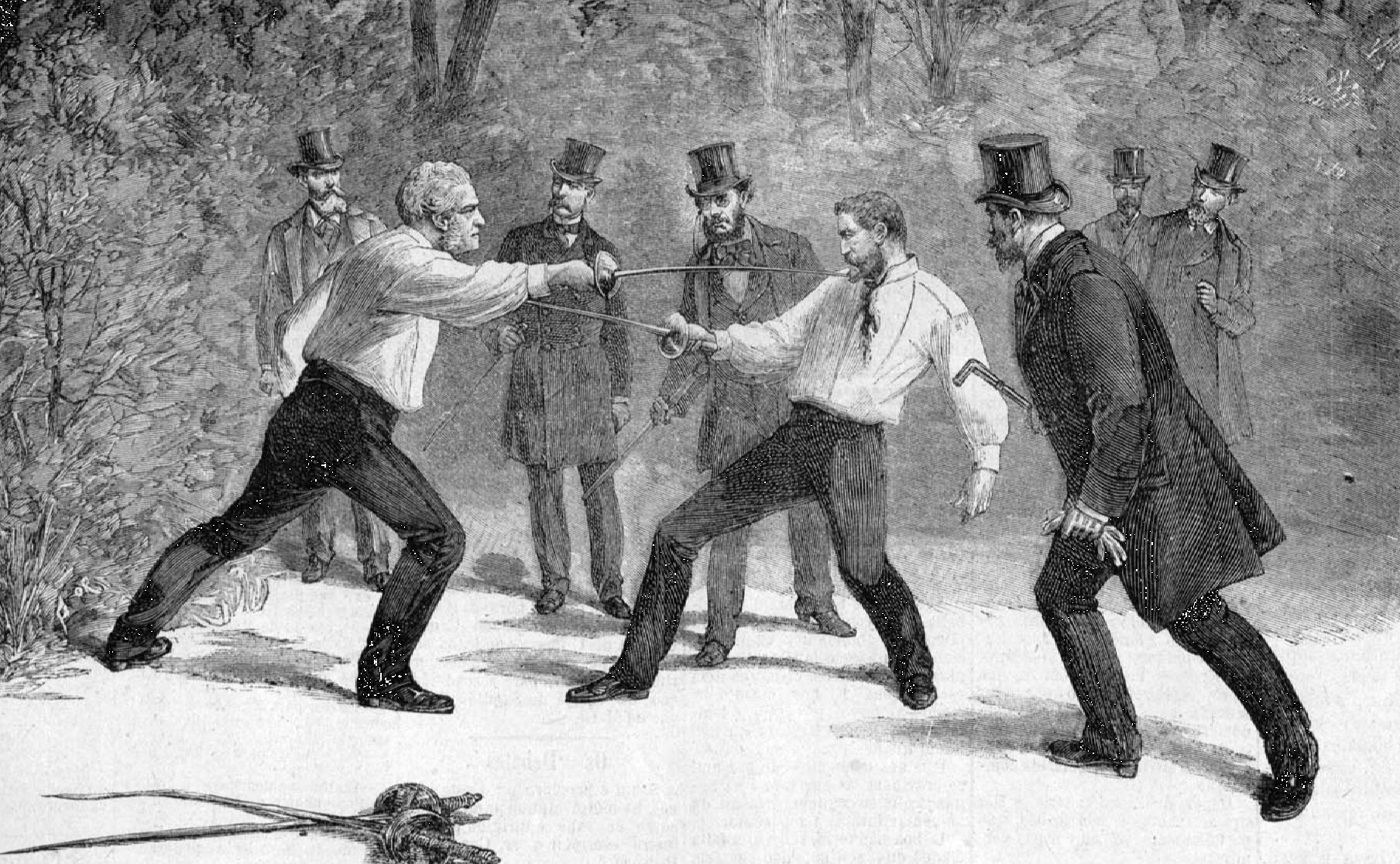
The duel between Floquet and General Boulanger in 1888

In 1882 he held for a short time the post of prefect of the Seine. In 1885 he succeeded Henri Brisson as president of the chamber. This difficult position he filled with such tact and impartiality that he was re-elected the two following years. Having approached the Russian ambassador in such a way as to remove the prejudice existing against him in Russia since the incident of 1867, he rendered himself eligible for office; and on the fall of the Tirard cabinet in 1888 he became president of the council and minister of the interior in a radical ministry, which pledged itself to the revision of the constitution, but was forced to combat the proposals of General Boulanger. Heated debates in the chamber culminated on 13 July in a duel between Floquet and Boulanger in which the latter was wounded. In the following February, the government fell on the question of revision, and in the new chamber of November, Floquet was re-elected to the presidential chair. The Panama scandals, in which he was compelled to admit his implication, destroyed his career: he lost the presidency of the chamber in 1892, and his seat in the house in 1893, but in 1894 was elected to the senate. He died in Paris.

See Discours et opinions de M. Charles Floquet, edited by Albert Faivre (1885).

== Floquet’s Ministry, 3 April 1888 – 22 February 1889 ==
- Charles Floquet – President of the Council and Minister of the Interior
- René Goblet – Minister of Foreign Affairs
- Charles de Freycinet – Minister of War
- Paul Peytral – Minister of Finance
- Jean-Baptiste Ferrouillat – Minister of Justice and Worship
- Jules François Émile Krantz – Minister of Marine and Colonies
- Édouard Locroy – Minister of Public Instruction and Fine Arts
- Jules Viette – Minister of Agriculture
- Pierre Deluns-Montaud – Minister of Public Works
- Pierre Legrand – Minister of Commerce and Industry

Changes

- 5 February 1889 – Edmond Guyot-Dessaigne succeeds Ferrouillat as Minister of Justice and Worship.

Political offices
Preceded by Pierre Tirard	Prime Minister of France; 1888–1889	Succeeded by Pierre Tirard
