= Étienne Clémentel =

French politician (1864–1936)

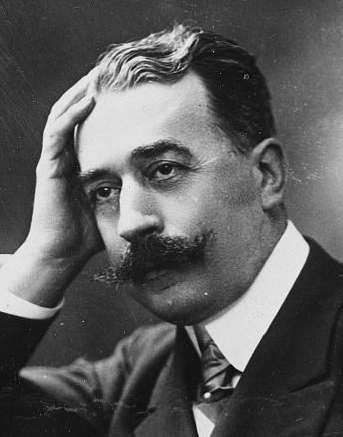
Étienne Clémentel

Étienne Clémentel (French pronunciation: [etjɛn klemɑ̃tɛl]; 11 January 1864 – 25 December 1936) was a French politician. He served as a member of the National Assembly of France from 1900 to 1919 and as French Senator from 1920 to 1936. He also served as Minister of Colonies from 24 January 1905 to 14 March 1906, Minister of Agriculture from 22 March 1913 to 9 December 1913 and Minister of Finance from 9 June 1914 to 13 June 1914. He was the first president of International Court of Arbitration. He was Minister of Commerce, Industry, Posts and Telegraphs from 29 October 1915 to 27 November 1919.

== Biography ==
Étienne Clémentel was born on 11 January 1864 in Clermont-Ferrand, Puy-de-Dôme, France. He was trained as property solicitor.

He was also a painter and a photographer. Some of his work can be found in the Musée d'Orsay.

He died on 25 December 1936 in Prompsat, Puy-de-Dôme, France.

== Legacy ==
- His bust, sculpted by Auguste Rodin, can be found in the Musée Rodin.
