= Pierre Legrand =

French politician

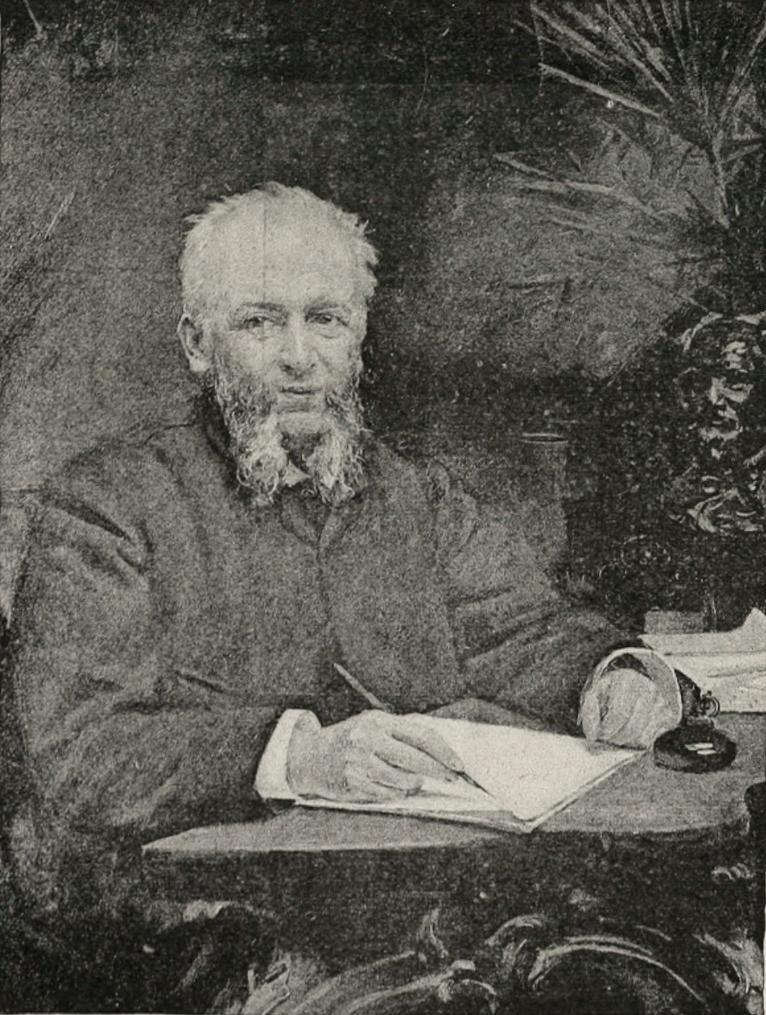
Portrait by Jean-Joseph Weerts.

Pierre Legrand (13 May 1834, Paris – 31 May 1895, Paris) was a 19th-century French politician of the French Third Republic. He served twice as minister of commerce (7 August 1882 – 20 February 1883; 6 April 1885 – 6 January 1886) in the government of Charles Duclerc, Armand Fallières and Henri Brisson and as minister of commerce and industry (3 April 1888 – 3 February 1889) in the government of Charles Floquet.

== Sources ==
- "Pierre Legrand", in Adolphe Robert and Gaston Cougny, Dictionnaire des parlementaires français (1789-1891), Bourloton, Paris, 1889 Edition details Wikisource
- Moiroux, Jules (1908). S. Mercadier (ed.). Le cimetière du Père Lachaise. Paris. p. 226.
