= Ferdinand Sarrien =

French politician

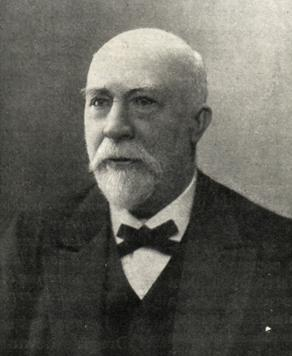

Prime Minister of France
- In office 12 March 1906 – 25 October 1906
- President: Armand Fallières
- Preceded by: Maurice Rouvier
- Succeeded by: Georges Clemenceau

Personal details
- Born: 15 October 1840
- Died: 28 November 1915 (aged 75)
- Party: Radical Party

Jean Marie Ferdinand Sarrien (French: [fɛʁdinɑ̃ saʁjɛ̃]; 15 October 1840 – 28 November 1915) was a French politician of the Third Republic. He was born in Bourbon-Lancy, Saône-et-Loire and died in Paris. As Prime Minister, he headed a cabinet supported by the Bloc des gauches (Left-Wing Coalition) parliamentary majority.

== Biography ==
Ferdinand Sarrien was born on 15 October 1840 in Bourbon-Lancy. After studying law, he became a lawyer. During the Franco-Prussian War he was distinguished and was decorated. As a member of the Republican party, he became mayor of his hometown. However, in 1873, he was discharged by the monarchist cabinet of Albert de Broglie. He became Prime Minister in 1906, in succession to Maurice Rouvier. His ministry lasted only six months, before he resigned for health reasons, but it was noteworthy for the number of strong personalities it included.

Sarrien's premiership was also notable for the introduction by law (in July 1906) of a mandatory weekly rest period of 24 hours.

== Sarrien's Ministry, 12 March – 25 October 1906 ==
- Ferdinand Sarrien – President of the Council and Minister of Justice
- Léon Bourgeois – Minister of Foreign Affairs
- Eugène Étienne – Minister of War
- Georges Clemenceau – Minister of the Interior
- Raymond Poincaré – Minister of Finance
- Gaston Doumergue – Minister of Labour, Commerce, and Industry
- Gaston Thomson – Minister of Marine
- Aristide Briand – Minister of Public Instruction, Fine Arts, and Worship
- Joseph Ruau – Minister of Agriculture
- Georges Leygues – Minister of Colonies
- Louis Barthou – Minister of Public Works, Posts, and Telegraphs

== Notes ==
Political offices
| Preceded by Joseph Chaumié | Minister of Justice; 1906 | Succeeded by Jean François Edmond Guyot Dessaigne |
| Preceded by Maurice Rouvier | Prime Minister of France; 1906 | Succeeded by Georges Clemenceau |
