= Albert Dauphin =

French lawyer and politician (1827–1898)

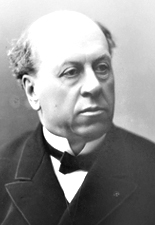
- Born: 26 August 1827; Amiens, Somme, France
- Died: 14 November 1898 (aged 71); Amiens, Somme, France
- Occupations: Lawyer and politician

Henri Albert Dauphin (26 August 1827 – 14 November 1898) was a French lawyer and politician. He served as a member of the National Assembly from 7 January 1872 to 1 March 1892, representing Somme. He also served in the French Senate from 1876 to 1898, representing Somme. He was the mayor of Amiens from 1868 to 1873.

He was Minister of Finance from 11 December 1886 to 29 May 1887.

He was a commander of the Legion of Honour.
