= AFNOR =

French national standardization organization

Association Française de Normalisation (AFNOR, English: French Standardization Association) is a Paris-based standards organization and a member body for France at the International Organization for Standardization (ISO).

The AFNOR Group develops its international standardization activities, information provision, certification and training through a network of key partners in France who are members of the association. They are:

- ACTIA (Association of Technical Cooperation for the food industry)
- ADEME (French Agency for Environment and Energy Management)
- ADEPT (Association for the development of international trade in food products and techniques)
- COFRAC (French Accreditation Committee)
- CSTB (Scientific and Technical Center for Construction)
- CTI (Center Network industrial technology)
- INERIS (National Institute for Industrial Environment and Risks) emerged from CERCHAR (Study and research centre of the Charbonnages de France) and IRCHA (National research institute of applied chemistry)
- LCIE (Laboratoire Central des Industries Électriques)
- LNE (Laboratoire National Metrology and Testing)
- UTAC (Union Technique de l'automobile, cycle and motorcycle)
- UTE (Union Technique de l'Électricité)

== See also ==
- International Organization for Standardization
- Countries in the International Organization for Standardization
- ISO country code

== Examples of norms ==
- ARCADIA
