= Ministry of the Overseas (France) =

Government ministry of France

- Ministère des Outre-mer
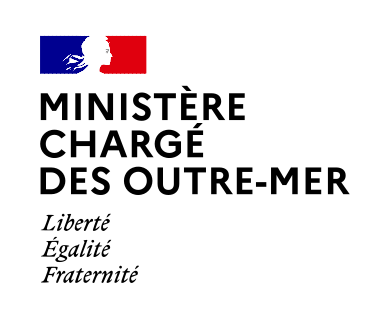

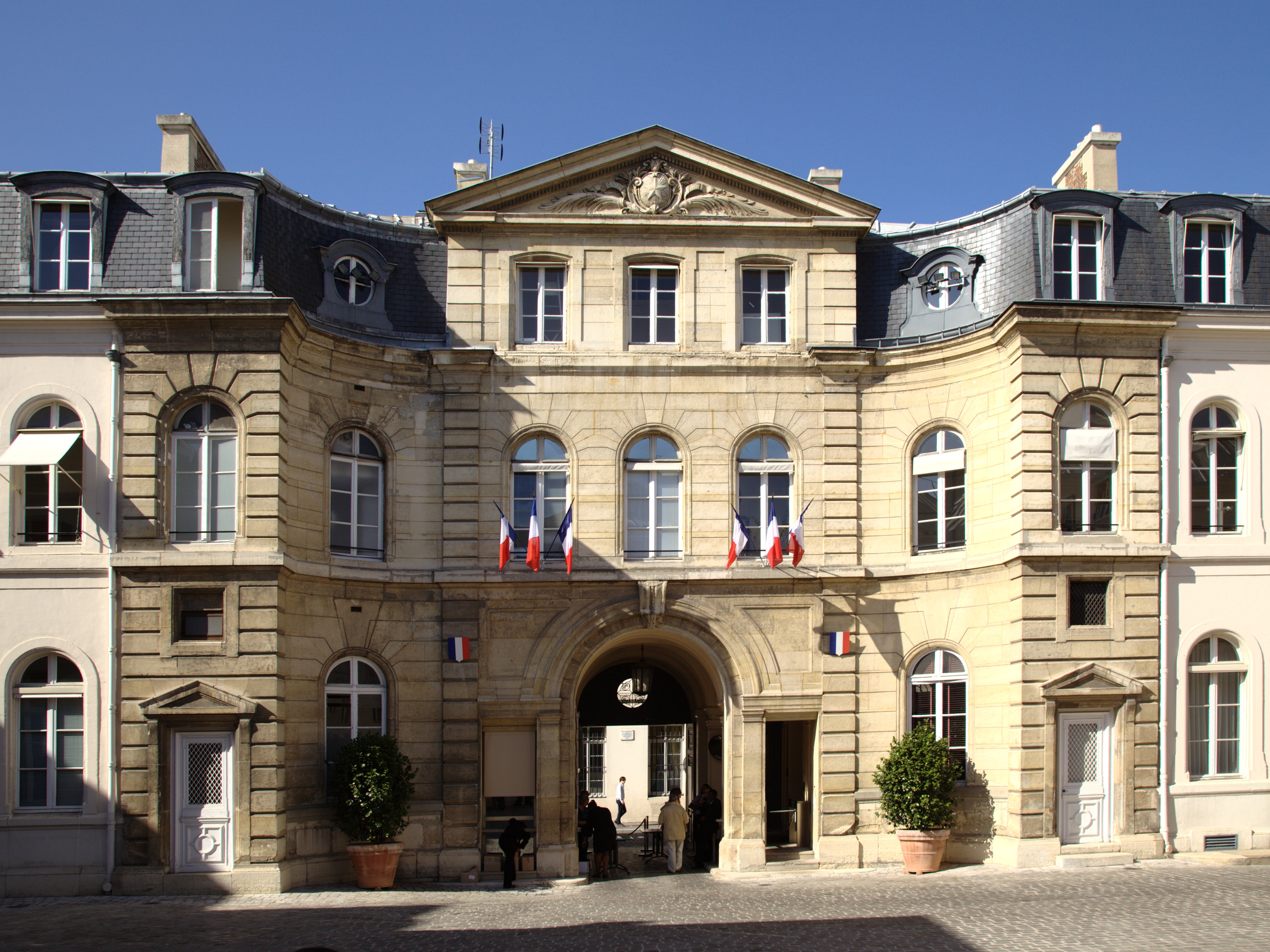
- The Hôtel de Montmorin houses the Ministry of the Overseas

Agency overview
- Formed: 1710; 316 years ago
- Type: Ministry
- Jurisdiction: Overseas France
- Headquarters: Hôtel de Montmorin Paris 7e, French Republic; 48°50′57″N 2°18′57″E
- Employees: 5,548
- Annual budget: €2.661 billion
- Minister responsible: Naïma Moutchou
- Website: www.outre-mer.gouv.fr

The Ministry of the Overseas (French: Ministère des Outre-mer [ministɛʁ dez‿utʁəmɛʁ]) is a ministry of the Government of France, responsible for overseeing the overseas departments, collectivities and territories of the French Republic. It is headed by the Minister of the Overseas, Naïma Moutchou, since 12 October 2025.

== History ==
Originally part of the Ministry of the Navy as a bureau, it became a formal ministry on 20 March 1894 as the Ministry of the Colonies (French: Ministère des Colonies), by a law of the government of Jean Casimir-Perier.

By a decree of 26 January 1946, its name was changed to the current Ministry of Overseas (French: Ministère de la France d'Outre-mer).

== See also ==
- Minister of the Overseas (France)
