= Ernest Boulanger =

Ernest Boulanger may refer to:

- Ernest Boulanger (politician) (1831–1907), French politician
- Ernest Boulanger (composer) (1815–1900), French composer

== See also ==
- Georges Ernest Boulanger (1837–1891), French general and politician
