= Val-d'Oise's 4th constituency =

Constituency of the French Fifth Republic

4th constituency of Val-d'Oise
- inline Constituency of the National Assembly of France

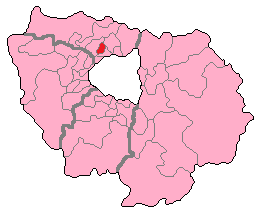
- Val-d'Oise's 4th Constituency shown within Île-de-France
- Deputy: Naïma Moutchou; H
- Department: Val-d'Oise
- Cantons: Eaubonne - Ermont - Franconville - Saint-Leu-la-Forêt
- Registered voters: 76,060

The 4th constituency of Val-d'Oise is a French legislative constituency in the Val-d'Oise département. It is currently represented by Naïma Moutchou of Horizons.

== Description ==
The 4th constituency of Val-d'Oise is composed of the areas north of Argenteuil in the centre of the department. The seat almost entirely urban as it is composed of towns that form parts of the northern suburbs of Paris.

Historically the seat has been consistent in supporting conservative candidates but this changed in 2012 as the seat was won by Gérard Sebaoun of the PS.

== Historic Representation ==
Election	Member	Party
1967	René Ribière	UDR
1968	René Ribière	UDR
1973	René Ribière	UDR
1978	André Petit	UDF
1981	André Petit	UDF
1986	Proportional representation – no election by constituency	
1988	Francis Delattre	UDF
1993	Francis Delattre	UDF
1997	Francis Delattre	UDF
2002	Francis Delattre	UMP
2007	Claude Bodin	UMP
2012	Gérard Sebaoun	PS
2017	Naïma Moutchou	LREM
2022	Naïma Moutchou	H

== Election results ==
=== 2024 ===
Candidate	Party	Alliance	First round			Second round		
Candidate	Party	Alliance	Votes	%	+/–	Votes	%	+/–
Karine Lacouture	LFI	NFP	17,498	34.65	+3.98	20,008	44.61	-1.96
Naïma Moutchou	HOR	ENS	14,084	27.89	-1.14	24,840	55.39	+1.96
Sébastien Meurant	LR-RN	UXD	13,238	26.22	+13.21	WITHDREW		
Inthone Rodsphon	LR diss.		3,003	5.95	N/A			
Grégory Berthault	DVE		2,132	4.22	-1.71			
Marie-Françoise L'Hommedet	LO		485	0.96	+0.12			
Robin Durand	DIV		52	0.10	N/A			
Antonin Martin	DIV		0	0.00	N/A			
Valid votes			50,492	98.08	-0.49	44,848	92.45	-1.21
Blank votes			728	1.41	+0.35	2,780	5.73	+1.05
Null votes			262	0.51	+0.14	880	1.81	+0.16
Turnout			52,482	67.51	+19.44	48,508	62.61	+15.36
Abstentions			23,780	32.49	-19.44	27,751	36.39	-15.36
Registered voters			76,262			76,259		
Source: Ministry of the Interior, Le Monde
Result						HOR HOLD		

=== 2022 ===
Legislative Election 2022: Val-d'Oise's 4th constituency
Party	Candidate	Votes	%	±%
LFI (NUPÉS)	Karine Lacouture	10,984	30.67	+7.70
HOR (Ensemble)	Naïma Moutchou	10,397	29.03	-12.23
RN	Régis Macé	4,659	13.01	+1.71
LR (UDC)	Patrick Boullé	4,479	12.51	−4.50
DVE	Grégory Berthault	2,122	5.93	N/A
REC	Fréderic Georjon	2,021	5.64	N/A
Others	N/A	1,151		
Turnout		36,331	48.07	+0.72
2nd round result
HOR (Ensemble)	Naïma Moutchou	17,869	53.43	-5.94
LFI (NUPÉS)	Karine Lacouture	15,575	46.57	N/A
Turnout		33,444	47.25	+7.87
HOR gain from LREM				

=== 2017 ===
Candidate	Label	First round		Second round	
Candidate	Label	Votes	%	Votes	%
Naïma Moutchou	REM	14,620	41.26	16,081	59.37
Claude Bodin	LR	6,028	17.01	11,007	40.63
Olivia Nalpas	FN	4,003	11.30		
Cathy Pinheiro	FI	3,951	11.15		
Marie-José Beaulande	PS	2,313	6.53		
Emmanuel Rodriguez	ECO	1,319	3.72		
Emmanuel Landreau	UDI	672	1.90		
Philippe Lange	DIV	563	1.59		
Estelle Auboin	PCF	555	1.57		
Cédric Doriol	DIV	423	1.19		
Marie-Christine Michel	EXD	291	0.82		
Liudmila Tesson	DIV	283	0.80		
Marie-Françoise L'Hommedet	EXG	272	0.77		
Dany Mercier	DVG	84	0.24		
Michel Lucarelli	EXG	59	0.17		
Votes		35,436	100.00	27,088	100.00
Valid votes		35,436	98.39	27,088	90.44
Blank votes		431	1.20	2,170	7.24
Null votes		148	0.41	694	2.32
Turnout		36,015	47.35	29,952	39.38
Abstentions		40,045	52.65	46,109	60.62
Registered voters		76,060		76,061	
Source: Ministry of the Interior

=== 2012 ===
Legislative Election 2012: Val-d'Oise's 4th constituency
Party	Candidate	Votes	%	±%
PS	Gérard Sebaoun	15,101	36.96	
UMP	Claude Bodin	14,704	35.98	
FG	Patrice Lavaud	2,220	5.43	
MoDem	Jean-Philippe Picard-Bachelerie	1,244	3.04	
EELV	Nicole Gauvain-Kerymel	1,120	2.74	
Others	N/A	1,265		
Turnout		40,863	56.27	
2nd round result
PS	Gérard Sebaoun	20,122	50.25	
UMP	Claude Bodin	19,918	49.75	
Turnout		40,040	55.14	
PS gain from UMP				

=== 2007 ===
Legislative Election 2007: Val-d'Oise's 4th constituency
Party	Candidate	Votes	%	±%
UMP	Claude Bodin	16,696	39.27	
PS	Gérard Sebaoun	10,241	24.09	
DVD	Jean-Pierre Enjalbert	4,390	10.33	
MoDem	Christophe Quarez	3,831	9.01	
FN	Gérard Tabary	1,872	4.40	
PCF	Rosita Jaouen	1,201	2.82	
LV	Eric Grujard	989	2.33	
Far left	Sylvie Parquet	921	2.17	
Others	N/A	2,375		
Turnout		43,053	59.91	
2nd round result
UMP	Claude Bodin	21,491	54.94	
PS	Gérard Sebaoun	17,626	45.06	
Turnout		40,225	55.98	
UMP hold				

=== 2002 ===
Legislative Election 2002: Val-d'Oise's 4th constituency
Party	Candidate	Votes	%	±%
UMP	Francis Delattre	19,583	45.40	
PRG	Elisabeth Boyer	13,495	31.29	
FN	Jean-Pierre Guidon	5,246	12.16	
LCR	Alice Pelletier	978	2.27	
Others	N/A	3,833		
Turnout		43,873	63.58	
2nd round result
UMP	Francis Delattre	22,263	57.28	
PRG	Elisabeth Boyer	16,603	42.72	
Turnout		40,186	58.24	
UMP gain from UDF				

=== 1997 ===
Legislative Election 1997: Val-d'Oise's 4th constituency
Party	Candidate	Votes	%	±%
UDF	Francis Delattre	11,071	25.67	
PRG	François Gayet	10,689	24.79	
FN	Jean-Pierre Guidon	7,497	17.39	
PCF	Rosita Jaouen	3,398	7.88	
LV	Jean-Christophe Poulet	1,823	4.23	
DVD	Christophe Quarrez	1,636	3.79	
GE	Daniel Blaise	1,482	3.44	
DVD	Daniel Michel	1,407	3.26	
LO	Jean-Claude Bon	1,181	2.74	
Others	N/A	1,890		
Turnout		44,787	64.88	
2nd round result
UDF	Francis Delattre	22,278	50.23	
PRG	François Gayet	22,078	49.77	
Turnout		47,464	68.76	
UDF hold				

== Sources ==
Official results of French elections from 2002: "Résultats électoraux officiels en France" (in French).
