= Nantillois =

Commune in Meuse, Grand Est, France

- Commune
- Coat of arms
- Location of Nantillois
- Location within France Location within Grand Est
- Coordinates: 49°17′58″N 5°08′24″E
- Country: France
- Region: Grand Est
- Department: Meuse
- Arrondissement: Verdun
- Canton: Clermont-en-Argonne
- Intercommunality: Pays de Stenay et Val Dunois

Government
  - Mayor (2020–2026): Manuel Nanan
- Area^{1}: 7.66 km^{2} (2.96 sq mi)
- Elevation: 231 m (758 ft)
- Highest elevation: 275 m (902 ft)
- Lowest elevation: 208 m (682 ft)
- Population (2023): 63
  - Density: 8.2/km^{2} (21/sq mi)
- Time zone: UTC+01:00 (CET)
  - Summer (DST): UTC+02:00 (CEST)
- INSEE/Postal code: 55375 /55270
- ^{1} French Land Register data, which excludes lakes, ponds, glaciers > 1 km^{2} (0.386 sq mi or 247 acres) and river estuaries.

Nantillois (French pronunciation: [nɑ̃tilwa]) is a commune in the Meuse department in Grand Est in north-eastern France. Nantillois is situated on the D15 between Montfaucon and Romagne-sous-Montfaucon.

== World War One, the Meuse-Argonne Offensive ==
Nantillois was almost totally destroyed during World War One. It was occupied by the Germans for a little over 4 years, and liberated by the Americans on 28 September 1918, as part of the Meuse-Argonne Offensive which started on 26 September 1918. Several monuments are erected to commemorate the events of 1914–1918. The most important ones are the Nantillois German Cemetery (918 graves), the community building on the main street erected to commemorate the 315th Regiment of the 79th Division who liberated the village and the memorial fountain erected for the men of the 80th Division. The 80th Division relieved the 79th Division on 30 September, and suffered terrible losses in the attack on the Bois des Ogons, just outside the village.

A small private museum 'Meuse-Argonne 1918' is situated on the main street (D15) of Nantillois.

== Notable people ==
- Ernest Boulanger (politician) (1831-1907)

Senator of the Meuse (1886-1907) Minister of Foreign Affairs (20 March-29 May 1894)

A bust in his honour was unveiled in August 1909, and is nowadays one of the few structures that survived the First World War.

== See also ==
- Communes of the Meuse department
