= Raphaël Milliès-Lacroix =

French draper and politician

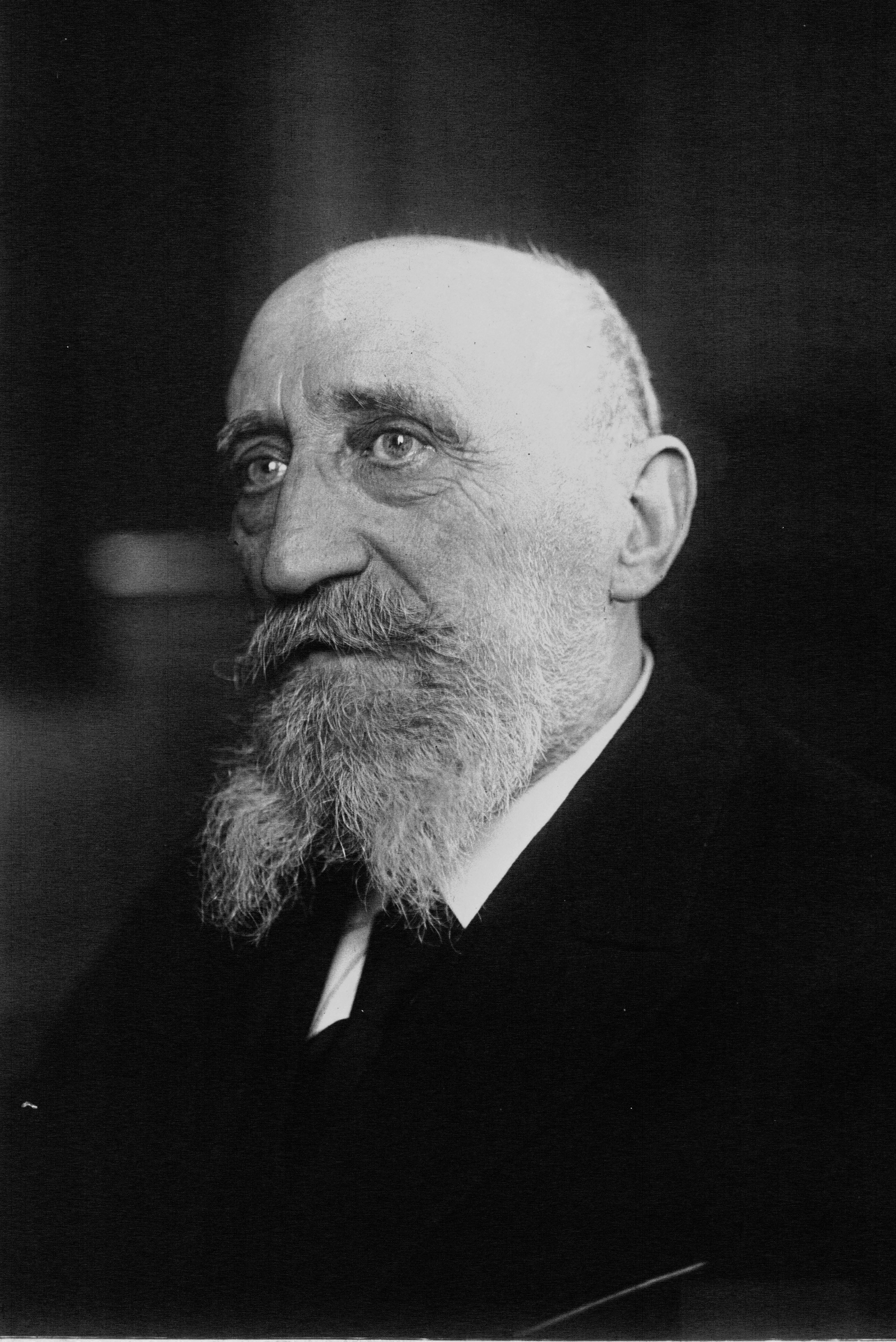
- Milliès-Lacroix in 1921

Minister of the Colonies
- In office 25 October 1906 – 24 July 1909
- Prime Minister: Georges Clemenceau
- Preceded by: Georges Leygues
- Succeeded by: Georges Trouillot

Personal details
- Born: 4 December 1850 Dax, Landes, France
- Died: 12 October 1941 (aged 90) Candresse, Landes, France
- Occupation: Draper

Raphaël Milliès-Lacroix (4 December 1850 – 12 October 1941) was a French draper and politician from Dax, Landes, in the southwest of the country. He was Minister of the Colonies in 1906–09.

== Early years ==
Raphaël Milliès-Lacroix was born in Dax, Landes, on 4 December 1850. His parents were the painter Jean-Eugène Milliès-Lacroix (1809–56) and Marie Joséphine Jouvenot, daughter of a wholesale fabric merchant. His father died while he was young. He hoped to go on to the Ecole polytechnique after completing his secondary education in Dax, but his grandfather insisted that he join the drapery business. During the Franco-Prussian War of 1870 he was enlisted and fought in the 55th infantry regiment. After returning the Dax, at the age of 21 he took charge of the wholesale fabric business, which prospered. He married Marie Betry-Golzart.

== Local politics ==
Milliès-Lacroix became a member of the Republican committee, then in 1877 was appointed secretary-treasurer of the Republican Committee of Resistance. He was a member of the Republican Committee of his constituency from 1877 to 1885, and secretary-general of the Republican Committee during the elections of 1885 and 1886. He was elected to the Dax municipal council in 1879, became deputy mayor in 1880 and mayor in 1887. He was a strong defender of the rights of local officials, and in 1891 had a duel with the sub-prefect of Dax over municipal franchises. In 1894 he was dismissed from his position as mayor by Charles Dupuy, the Minister of the Interior, for having authorized bullfights in defiance of prefectural directives.

Milliès-Lacroix was reelected as mayor without difficulty. During the Dreyfus affair he supported a retrial, in opposition to the other members of the municipal council, and resigned from the council. He was elected to the general council of the Landes department in 1898, became vice-president in 1908, and was president of the departmental assembly from 1922 to 1924. He was one of the main editors of the local newspaper Le Dacquois. He installed thermal baths in Dax, and undertook public works that drastically changed the urban landscape.

== National politics ==
Milliès-Lacroix ran successfully for election as a senator for Landes on 3 January 1897. He was reelected in 1906, 1920 and 1924. He sat with the Radical Democratic Left and Radical Socialist group. He was elected to the Senate Finance Committee in 1900, and was rapporteur of the budgets of the railways and of the Interior. Milliès-Lacroix was not known as a public speaker, but was an effective committee member and earned a reputation for his honesty and dedication to economy. In senate debates he was a firm defender of bullfighting.

Milliès-Lacroix was Minister of the Colonies from 25 October 1906 to 24 July 1909 in the cabinet of Georges Clemenceau. He made an extensive voyage in West Africa at his own expense. Clemenceau nicknamed him "the Negro". Despite his liberal principles, Milliès-Lacroix could not accept that an Algerian indigène could become truly French and qualified to vote if he refused to give up the statut personnel that protected his right to observe traditional and Islamic customs. After the fall of the Clemenceau government he returned to the Senate Finance Committee in 1910. He was rapporteur for the budgets of the ministries of the Interior and of War from 1911 to 1917. He was general rapporteur of the budget in the Senate from 1917 to 1920, and chaired the Senate Budget Committee from 1920 to 1924. He was elected vice president of the Senate on 10 January 1929, holding this position for the rest of his senate career.

Milliès-Lacroix did not run in the 1933 elections, when his son Eugène Milliès-Lacroix was elected in his place. He died in Candresse on 12 October 1941 at the age of 90. He had refused the Legion of Honor, which Charles Dupuy offered to him if he would withdraw his candidacy for the Senate.

== Publications ==
Milliès-Lacroix was the author of numerous proposals and reports to the Senate. He also published:

- Raphaël Milliès-Lacroix (1901). Les incendies dans les forêts de pins des Landes de Gascogne. Etude sur le projet de loi déposé au Sénat (in French). Paris: impr. de P. Mouillot. p. 70.
- Raphaël Milliès-Lacroix (1933). Histoire de Dax (in French).

== Sources ==
- Drouin, Jean-Claude (1991). "Raphael MILLIES-LACROIX". In Bernadette Suau (ed.). Mémoire des Landes: dictionnaire biographique (in French). Comité d'études sur l'histoire et l'art de Gascogne. ISBN 978-2-9501584-2-0.
- Drouin, Jean-Claude (1998-01-01). Sylvie Guillaume, Bernard Lachaise (ed.). Dictionnaire des parlementaires d'Aquitaine sous la Troisième République (in French). Presses Univ de Bordeaux. ISBN 978-2-86781-231-6.
- Jolly, Jean (1960–1977). "MILLIÈS-LACROIX (RAPHAËL)". Dictionnaire des parlementaires français (1889–1940). Paris: Presses universitaires de France. ISBN 2-1100-1998-0.
- "Raphaël Milliès-Lacroix Auteur du texte" (in French). BnF.
- Spickard, Paul (2005-07-08). Race and Nation: Ethnic Systems in the Modern World. Routledge. ISBN 978-1-135-93060-8.
