= Jean-Jacques Juglas =

French politician (1904–1982)

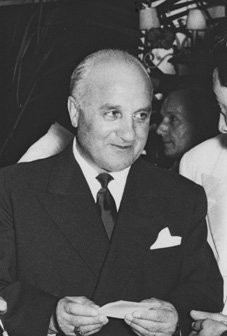

Député for Seine and Lot-et-Garonne
- In office 1945–1955
- Constituency: Seine and Lot-et-Garonne

Personal details
- Born: 10 June 1904
- Died: 17 August 1982 (aged 78)
- Party: MRP

Jean-Jacques Juglas (10 June 1904 in Bergerac (Dordogne) – 17 August 1982 in Paris), was a French politician.

== Positions ==
- Minister of Overseas France in the Pierre Mendès France government (20 January 1955 to 23 February 1955)
- MRP deputy for the Seine (1945–1951)
- MRP deputy for Lot-et-Garonne (1951–1955)
- President of the Institut de recherche pour le développement (1960s)
