= Marie Pochon =

French environmental activist and politician

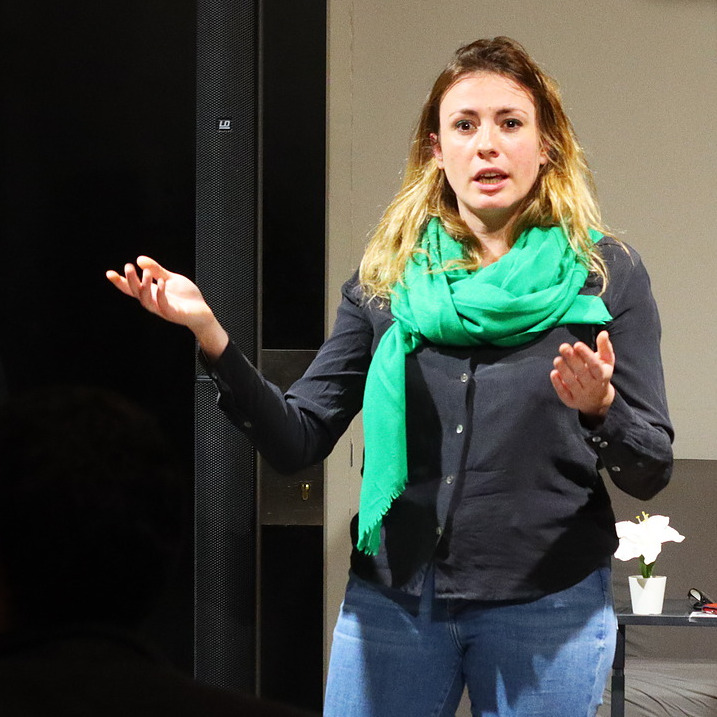
- Pochon in 2024

Member of the National Assembly for Drôme's 3rd constituency
- Incumbent
- Assumed office 22 June 2022
- Preceded by: Célia de Lavergne

Personal details
- Born: 4 May 1990 (age 36) Grenoble, France
- Party: EELV

Marie Pochon (French pronunciation: [maʁi pɔʃɔ̃]; born 4 May 1990) is a French environmental activist and politician. A member of Europe Ecology – The Greens, she currently serves as National Assembly deputy for Drôme's 3rd constituency.

== Biography ==
Pochon was born on 4 May 1990 in Grenoble, in Auvergne-Rhône-Alpes. Her mother worked as a viticulturist while her father worked as head of the Lycée Camille Vernet in Valence, Drôme. She earned her bachelor's degree in political science at the Institut d'études politiques de Lyon before earning a master's degree in international relations at the Centre International de Formation Européenne. While completing her master's, she lived in Berlin and then in Istanbul, and volunteered with organisations helping refugees of the Syrian civil war and was active with the Federation of Young European Greens.

In 2017, she joined Notre affaire à tous, a French climate justice advocacy group, eventually becoming the group's secretary-general and helping launch the L'Affaire du siècle campaign.

In the 2022 French legislative election, she presented herself as a candidate for Drôme's 3rd constituency with Europe Ecology – The Greens, as part of the New Ecological and Social People's Union (NUPES) coalition. Her candidacy initially attracted some controversy, with some local members of the party accusing her of being a parachute candidate. She finished with 35.49% of the vote in the first round of the elections, qualifying for the second round. In the second round, she finished with 52.22% of the vote, defeating La République En Marche! incumbent Célia de Lavergne.

She currently sits on the Sustainable Development, Spatial and Regional Planning Committee.
