= Louis Jacquinot =

French lawyer and politician

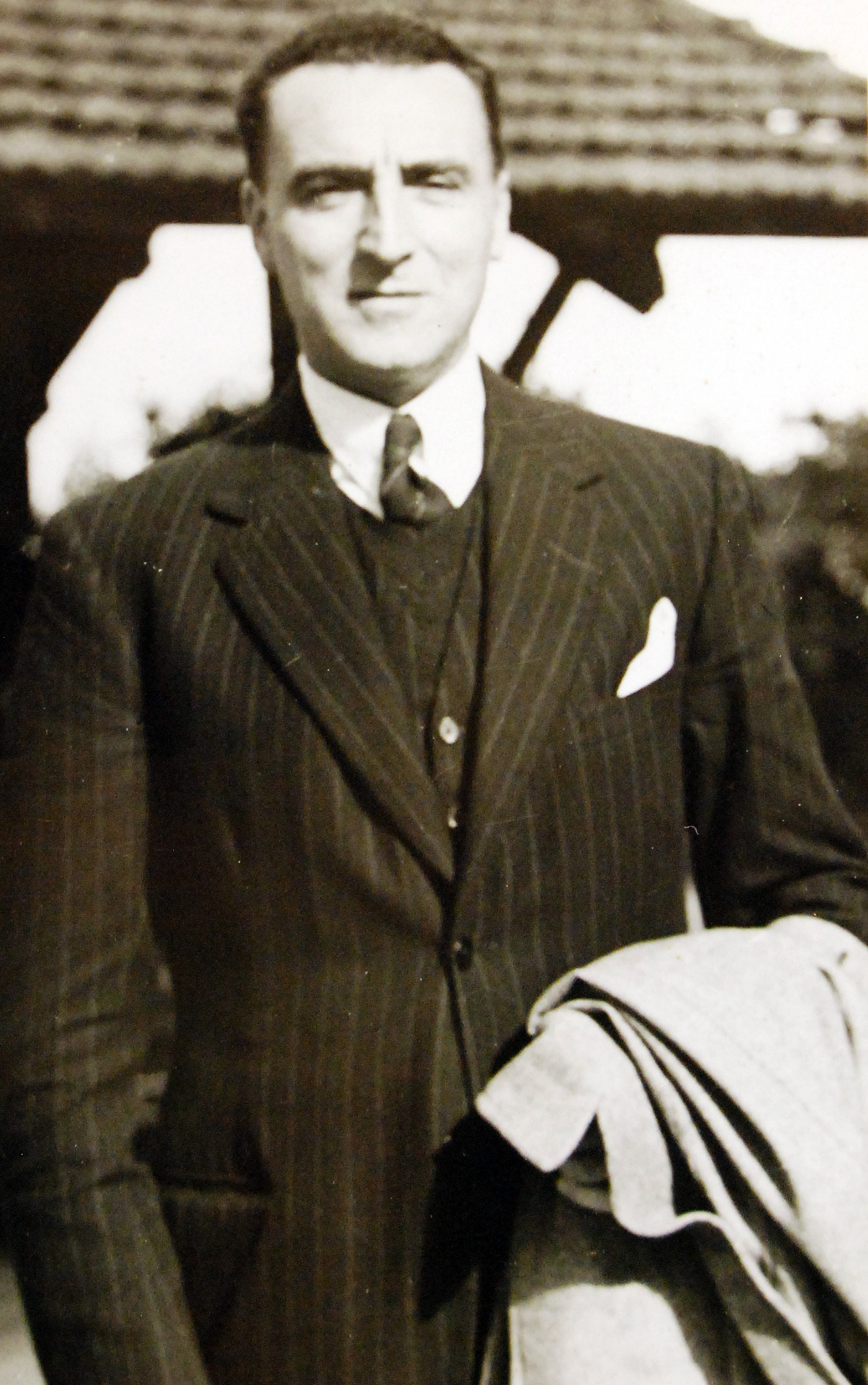
Jacquinot during his term as High Commissioner of the Navy

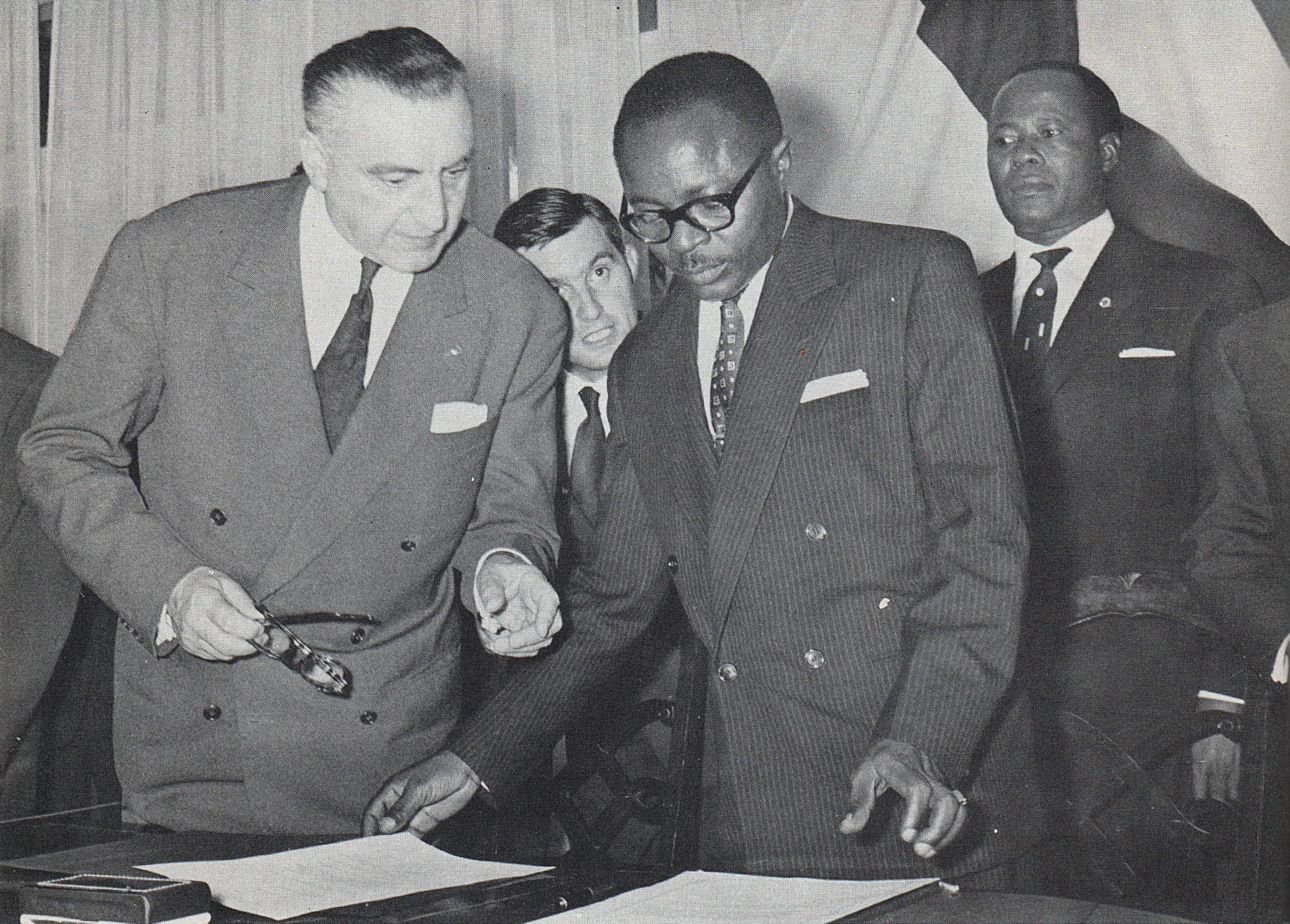
Jacquinot (left) and President of Upper Volta Maurice Yaméogo, 1960

Louis Jacquinot (English: /ʒækɪˈnoʊ/ zhak-ih-NOH, French: [lwi ʒakino]; 16 September 1898 – 14 June 1993) was a French lawyer and politician, and chief of Prime Minister Raymond Poincaré's office.

== Biography ==
Jacquinot was born in Gondrecourt-le-Château (Meuse) in 1898. Entering parliament in 1932, he later served for a short time as under-secretary of state for home affairs in Paul Reynaud's cabinet (1940). He served in the army in World War II and followed General de Gaulle to London. He served as High Commissioner for the Navy in the provisional governments at Algiers and Paris, Minister of State for Muslim Affairs (1945), Minister of Marine (Navy) (1947), Minister of Veterans and War Victims (1949), Minister of Overseas France (1951–52 and 1953–54).

After de Gaulle's return to power in 1958, he was appointed Minister of State in charge of scientific research and afterwards for the Sahara. As Minister of State, he was part of a "study group" formed by de Gaulle with the purpose of devising a constitution for the Fifth Republic. Later he again held the position of Minister for Overseas France (1961–66). He also chaired the General Council of the Meuse department in the Lorraine Province. A moderate right-wing politician during the Third and Fourth Republics, during the de Gaulle era, he voted with Giscard d'Estaing's independent republicans and later as a member of the Gaullist Union of Democrats for the Fifth Republic. He left parliament in 1973. Jacquinot married the wife of former Finance Minister Maurice Petsche in order to be elected president that year, but he was homosexual.

He died in Paris in 1993.
