= Jean Morel (politician) =

French politician

Jean-Baptiste Morel

Minister of the Colonies
- In office 3 November 1910 – 2 March 1911
- Prime Minister: Aristide Briand
- Preceded by: Georges Trouillot
- Succeeded by: Adolphe Messimy

Minister of the Colonies
- In office 21 January 1913 – 9 December 1913
- Prime Minister: Aristide Briand; Louis Barthou
- Preceded by: René Besnard
- Succeeded by: Albert François Lebrun

Personal details
- Born: 10 October 1854 Nandax, Loire, France
- Died: 7 February 1927 (aged 72) Paris, France
- Occupation: Pharmacist

Jean-Baptiste Morel (French pronunciation: [ʒɑ̃ batist mɔʁɛl]; 10 October 1854 – 7 February 1927) was a French politician who was twice Minister of the Colonies in the period immediately before World War I (1914–18). During the war he led an influential committee on economic warfare.

== Early years ==
Jean-Baptiste Morel was born on 10 October 1854 in Nandax, Loire. He attended the Ecole supérieure de pharmacie de Paris (Pharmacy School of Paris) where he won various prizes and medals. He was elected local councilor on 28 July 1889, then Mayor of Charlieu in May 1896. He became a councilor-general of the Loire department on 9 December 1894, and later became president of the council.

== National politics ==
On 8 May 1898 Morel ran for election as deputy for the Roanne constituency, and won in the first round. He was reelected in the second round of the April–May 1902 elections. He ran for election to the Senate on 7 January 1906, but was not elected. He was reelected deputy on 10 May 1906. In 1906 Morel was secretary of a Customs Commission to examine tariff needs in a changing industrial landscape. The committee issued a protectionist report, but the recommendations were blocked by supporters of firms that exported luxury goods.

Morel was appointed Minister of the Colonies on 3 November 1910 in the cabinet of Aristide Briand, holding office until the cabinet fell on 2 March 1911. He again ran for election to the Senate of 7 January 1912, and this time succeeded. He was again appointed Minister for the Colonies on 21 January 1913 in the cabinet of Aristide Briand, and retained that position in the succeeding cabinet of Louis Barthou, holding office until 9 December 1913.

During World War I (1914–18) the Bureau d'études économiques (Office of Economic Studies) was set up in July 1915 under Morel's leadership. The bureau contained permanent officials and parliamentarians, and was a "laboratory of ideas" for conducting economic warfare against Germany both before and after the military conflict. It also coordinated between the government and the parliamentary committees. It was highly influential in 1915–16, less so after the Ministry of Commerce took charge of planning for the post-war economy. Morel's committee was to define France's financial demands at the Versailles Conference. In 1917 a Comité d'Études was established to prepare for material on national borders for the post-war Peace Conference, and in December 1918 André Tardieu began to coordinate its work with Morel's economic committee, but he had achieved little when the peace conference began.

Morel was reelected to the Senate on 11 January 1920 and on 6 January 1924. He sat with the Radical Democrats and Radical Socialists. He died from a paralytic stroke on 7 February 1927 in Paris, at the age of 72.

== Legacy ==
There is a rue Jean Morel in the towns of Regny, Charlieu, Annay and Coudekerque-Branche.

== Publications ==
- Henry Bérenger; Jean Morel (1913). Les intérêts de la France à l'ouverture du canal de Panama (in French). Discours au Sénat, séance du 26 mai 1913. Paris: Imprimerie Dubois & Bauer.
- Jean Morel (1917). Les ressources agricoles de la France coloniale (in French). Association nationale d'expansion économique. p. 23.

== Sources ==
- Jackson, Peter (2013-12-05). Beyond the Balance of Power: France and the Politics of National Security in the Era of the First World War. Cambridge University Press. ISBN 978-1-107-03994-0.
- Jolly, Jean (1960–1977). "Morel (Jean-Baptiste)". Dictionnaire des parlementaires français; notices biographiques sur les ministres, députés et sénateurs français de 1889 à 1940 (in French). Paris: Presses universitaires de France. ISBN 2-1100-1998-0.
- Keller, Morton (1990). Regulating a New Economy: Public Policy and Economic Change in America, 1900-1933. Harvard University Press. ISBN 978-0-674-75362-4.
- Wandycz, Piotr Stefan (1962-01-01). France and Her Eastern Allies, 1919-1925: French-Czechoslovak-Polish Relations from the Paris Peace Conference to Locarno. U of Minnesota Press. p. 21. ISBN 978-0-8166-5886-2.
- Williams, Andrew J. (1998). Failed Imagination?: New World Orders of the Twentieth Century. Manchester University Press. ISBN 978-0-7190-4787-9.
