= Florent Guillain =

French maritime engineer

Antoine-Florent Guillain
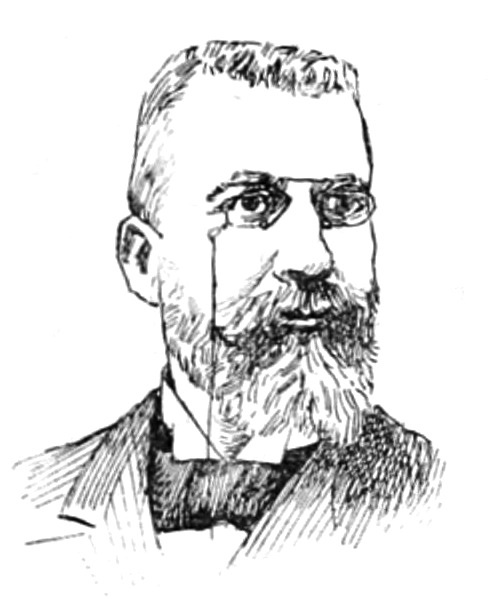
- Guillain by Maurice Dulac from Le Monde moderne, December 1898

Minister of Colonies
- In office 1 November 1898 – 22 June 1899
- Prime Minister: Charles Dupuy
- Preceded by: Georges Trouillot
- Succeeded by: Albert Decrais

Personal details
- Born: 7 February 1844 Paris, France
- Died: 19 April 1915 (aged 71) Paris, France

Antoine-Florent Guillain (7 February 1844 – 19 April 1915) was a French maritime engineer who designed a major upgrade to the port of Dunkirk, and rose to be Minister of Public Works. He was elected to the chamber of deputies in 1896 as a moderate Progressive Republican, and was Minister of the Colonies in 1898–99. He was appointed president or director of several major mining, shipbuilding, steel making and railway enterprises, and was a director of the Suez Canal Company and the Banque de France.

== Civil engineer ==
Florent Guillain was born on 7 February 1844 in Paris. He studied at the École polytechnique and the École des ponts-et-chaussées, where he qualified as a maritime engineer. He was assigned to the Channel ports in 1868. He made improvements to the deep water harbor of Boulogne and to the entrance of the harbor of Calais. His most important work was in Dunkirk, where he designed a sluice gate 117 metres (384 ft) long and 21 metres (69 ft) wide in 1874, and made other improvements to the harbor entrance and port basins. The new port designed by Guillain was officially opened in 1880. A submarine telegraph cable from Dunkirk to England went into service in 1881.

In 1888 Guillain was made director of Roads, Navigation and Mines in the Ministry of Public Works. In 1891 he was appointed inspector general of public works, and in 1893 was given responsibility for the national roads of France.

== Political career ==
In 1893 Guillain was elected to the general council of the Nord department as representative of the canton of Dunkirk East. On 13 December 1896 he ran as Progressive Republican candidate in a legislative by-election for the first district of Dunkirk, and was elected in the first round of voting. He was reelected in 1898, 1902 and 1906. Guillain was Minister of Colonies from November 1898 to June 1899 in the fourth and fifth cabinets of Charles Dupuy. He declined the same portfolio in the cabinet of Pierre Waldeck-Rousseau. He was vice-president of the chamber from 1902 to 1906. He supported moderate policies, and was protectionist in economics. He did not run for reelection in 1910.

== Industrial leader ==
In 1902 Guillain became chairman of the Compagnie Francaise Thomson-Houston (CFTH), a large electrical company, replacing Émile Mercet. Originally a General Electric holding company and marketing agent, CFTH had become primarily an owner of tramways and power companies. Under Guillain the emphasis began to shift towards electrical equipment manufacturing. In the ten years leading up to World War I (1914–18) he was one of the most influential of French industrialists. He was president of the Comité des forges and also of the Union des syndicats de l'électricité. He served as a director of several large companies including the coal mining enterprise Mines d'Anzin, the iron and steel manufacturer Marine-Homécourt, the shipbuilder Ateliers et Chantiers de France, the railway company Paris-Lyon-Méditerranée, the Suez Canal Company and the Banque de France. He was active in the Société de géographie in Paris.

Florent Guillain was appointed Commander of the Legion of Honour. He died in Paris on 19 April 1915. He was succeeded as president of the Comité des forges and of Thomson-Houston by Charles François Laurent.

== Mandates ==
Guillain's mandates in the chamber of deputies were:

Elected	Term end	Constituency	Parliamentary group
1896-12-13	1898-05-21	Nord	
1898-05-08	1902-05-21	Nord	
1902-04-27	1906-05-31	Nord	Républicains progressistes
1906-05-06	1919-05-21	Nord	Progressiste

== Publications ==
Guillain was the author of numerous parliamentary proposal and reports. Other publications include:

- Guillain, Florent (1871). Port de Dunkerque... Construction de l'écluse à sas d'entrée du nouveau bassin... Plan général de la ville et du port de Dunkerque, dressé par l'ingénieur ordinaire soussigné. Dunkerque: Ponts et chaussées, Département du Nord.
- Guillain, Florent (April 1913). preface. Le développement économique de la France. La houille blanche. By Cahen, Henri. Le 'Musée social'. Mémoires et documents. N° 4. Paris: A. Rousseau.

== Sources ==
- Cassis, Youssef (1997-06-26), Big Business : The European Experience in the Twentieth Century: The European Experience in the Twentieth Century, Oxford University Press, UK, ISBN 978-0-19-152179-9
- "Florent Guillain (1844-1915) - Auteur du texte" (in French). BnF.
- Hager, Willi (2014-03-21), "Guillain", Hydraulicians in Europe 1800-2000 (in French), CRC Press, ISBN 978-1-4665-5498-6
- Jolly, Jean (1960–1977), "Guillain (Florent)", Dictionnaire des parlementaires français; notices biographiques sur les ministres, députés et sénateurs français de 1889 à 1940 (in French), Paris: Presses universitaires de France, ISBN 2-1100-1998-0
- Fraboulet, Danièle (2007), Quand les patrons s'organisent: Stratégies et pratiques de l'UIMM 1901-1950 (in French), Presses Univ. Septentrion, ISBN 978-2-85939-994-8
- Smith, Michael Stephen (2006), The Emergence of Modern Business Enterprise in France, 1800-1930, Harvard University Press, ISBN 978-0-674-01939-3
- Staum, Martin S. (2003-08-20), Labeling People: French Scholars on Society, Race, and Empire, 1815–1848, McGill-Queen's Press - MQUP, ISBN 978-0-7735-7124-2
