= Minister of the Overseas =

Cabinet member in the Government of France

- Ministre des Outre-mer
- Jack of the Minister of the Overseas

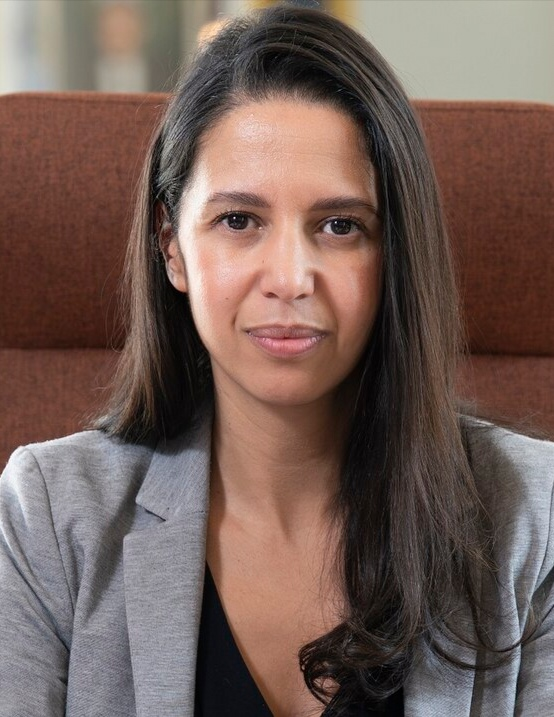
- Incumbent; Naïma Moutchou since 12 October 2025
- (France) Ministry of the Overseas
- Member of: Government; Council of Ministers
- Reports to: President of the Republic; Prime Minister
- Seat: Hôtel de Montmorin; Paris 7^{e}, France
- Nominator: Prime Minister
- Appointer: President of the Republic
- Term length: No fixed term
- Formation: 20 March 1894
- First holder: Ernest Boulanger
- Salary: €10,135 per month
- Website: outre-mer.gouv.fr

The Minister of the Overseas (French: Ministre des Outre-mer) is the official in charge of the Ministry of the Overseas in the Government of the French Republic, responsible for overseeing Overseas France. The office was titled Minister of the Colonies (Ministre des Colonies) until 1946.

The position is currently held by Naïma Moutchou in the government of Prime Minister Sébastien Lecornu with the title of Minister to the Prime Minister, in charge of the Overseas (Ministre auprès du Premier ministre, chargé des Outre-mer). She succeeded Manuel Valls on 12 October 2025.

== Officeholders ==
=== Minister of the Colonies (1894–1946) ===
Minister	Term of office
Ernest Boulanger	20 March – 30 May 1894
Théophile Delcassé	30 May 1894 – 26 January 1895
Émile Chautemps	26 January – 1 November 1895
Pierre-Paul Guieysse	4 November 1895 – 29 April 1896
André Lebon	29 April 1896 – 31 May 1898
Gabriel Hanotaux	31 May – 28 June 1898
Georges Trouillot	28 June – 1 November 1898
Florent Guillain	1 November 1898 – 22 June 1899
Albert Decrais	22 June 1899 – 7 June 1902
Gaston Doumergue	7 June 1902 – 24 January 1905
Étienne Clémentel	24 January 1905 – 14 March 1906
Georges Leygues	14 March – 25 October 1906
Raphaël Milliès-Lacroix	25 October 1906 – 24 July 1909
Georges Trouillot	24 July 1909 – 3 November 1910
Jean Morel	3 November 1910 – 2 March 1911
Adolphe Messimy	2 March – 27 June 1911
Albert François Lebrun	27 June 1911 – 12 January 1913
René Besnard	12–21 January 1913
Jean Morel	21 January – 9 December 1913
Albert François Lebrun	9 December 1913 – 9 June 1914
Maurice Maunoury	9–13 June 1914
Maurice Raynaud	13 June – 26 August 1914
Gaston Doumergue	26 August 1914 – 20 March 1917
André Maginot	20 March – 12 September 1917
René Besnard	12 September – 16 November 1917
Henry Simon	16 November 1917 – 20 January 1920
Albert Sarraut	20 January 1920 – 29 March 1924
Jean Fabry	29 March – 14 June 1924
Édouard Daladier	14 June 1924 – 17 April 1925
André Hesse	17 April – 29 October 1925
Léon Perrier	29 October 1925 – 19 July 1926
Adrien Dariac	19–23 July 1926
Léon Perrier	23 July 1926 – 6 November 1928
André Maginot	11 November 1928 – 3 November 1929
François Piétri	3 November 1929 – 21 February 1930
Lucien Lamoureux	21 February – 2 March 1930
François Piétri	2 March – 13 December 1930
Théodore Steeg	13 December 1930 – 27 January 1931
Paul Reynaud	27 January 1931 – 20 February 1932
Louis de Chappedelaine	20 February – 3 June 1932
Albert Sarraut	3 June 1932 – 6 September 1933
Albert Dalimier	6 September – 26 October 1933
François Piétri	26 October – 26 November 1933
Albert Dalimier	26 November 1933 – 9 January 1934
Lucien Lamoureux	9–30 January 1934
Henry de Jouvenel	30 January – 9 February 1934
Pierre Laval	9 February – 13 October 1934
Louis Rollin	13 October 1934 – 24 January 1936
Jacques Stern	24 January – 4 June 1936
Marius Moutet	4 June 1936 – 18 January 1938
Théodore Steeg	18 January – 13 March 1938
Marius Moutet	13 March – 10 April 1938
Georges Mandel	10 April 1938 – 18 May 1940
Louis Rollin	18 May – 16 June 1940
Albert Rivière	16 June – 12 July 1940
Henry Lémery	12 July – 6 September 1940
Charles Platon	6 September 1940 – 18 April 1942
René Pleven (Commissaire)	24 September 1941 – 28 July 1942
Jules Brévié	18 April 1942 – 26 March 1943
Hervé Alphand (Commissaire)	28 July – 17 October 1942
René Pleven (Commissaire)	17 October 1942 – 10 September 1944
Henri Bléhaut	26 March 1943 – 20 August 1944
René Pleven	10 September – 16 November 1944
Paul Giacobbi	16 November 1944 – 21 November 1945
Jacques Soustelle	21 November 1945 – 26 January 1946

=== Minister of the Overseas (1946–present) ===
Minister	Term of office
Marius Moutet	26 January – 23 December 1946
Auguste Laurent	23 December 1946 – 22 January 1947
Marius Moutet	22 January – 22 October 1947
Paul Coste-Floret	22 October 1947 – 29 October 1949
Jean Letourneau	29 October 1949 – 3 July 1950
Paul Coste-Floret	3–12 July 1950
François Mitterrand	12 July 1950 – 11 August 1951
Louis Jacquinot	11 August 1951 – 8 March 1952
Pierre Pflimlin	8 March 1952 – 8 January 1953
Louis Jacquinot	8 January 1953 – 19 June 1954
Robert Buron	19 June 1954 – 20 January 1955
Jean-Jacques Juglas	20 January – 23 February 1955
Pierre-Henri Teitgen	23 February 1955 – 1 February 1956
Gaston Defferre	1 February 1956 – 13 June 1957
Gérard Jaquet	13 June 1957 – 14 May 1958
André Colin	14 May – 9 June 1958
Bernard Cornut-Gentille	9 June 1958 – 8 January 1959
Robert Lecourt	5 February 1960 – 24 August 1961
Louis Jacquinot	24 August 1961 – 8 January 1966
Pierre Billotte	8 January 1966 – 30 May 1968
Joël Le Theule	30 May – 10 July 1968
Pierre Messmer	25 February 1971 – 7 July 1972
Bernard Stasi	2 April 1973 – 27 February 1974
Bernard Pons	20 March 1986 – 10 May 1988
Louis Le Pensec	23 June 1988 – 29 March 1993
Dominique Perben	29 March 1993 – 18 May 1995
Jean-Jacques de Peretti	18 May – 7 November 1995
Brigitte Girardin	7 May 2002 – 2 June 2005
François Baroin	2 June 2005 – 26 March 2007
Hervé Mariton	26 March – 19 June 2007
Michèle Alliot-Marie	19 June 2007 – 23 June 2009
Brice Hortefeux	23 June – 6 November 2009
Marie-Luce Penchard	6 November 2009 – 10 May 2012
Victorin Lurel	16 May 2012 – 2 April 2014
George Pau-Langevin	2 April 2014 – 30 August 2016
Annick Girardin	17 May 2017 – 6 July 2020
Sébastien Lecornu	6 July 2020 – 20 May 2022
Yaël Braun-Pivet	20 May – 25 June 2022
Élisabeth Borne (acting)	25 June – 4 July 2022
Jean-François Carenco	4 July 2022 – 20 July 2023
Philippe Vigier	20 July 2023 – 8 February 2024
Marie Guévenoux	8 February – 21 September 2024
François-Noël Buffet	21 September – 23 December 2024
Manuel Valls	23 December 2024 – 12 October 2025
Naïma Moutchou	12 October 2025 – present

== See also ==
- Archives nationales d'outre-mer, Aix-en-Provence
