= Drôme's 3rd constituency =

Constituency of the National Assembly of France

3rd constituency of Drôme
- inline Constituency of the National Assembly of France

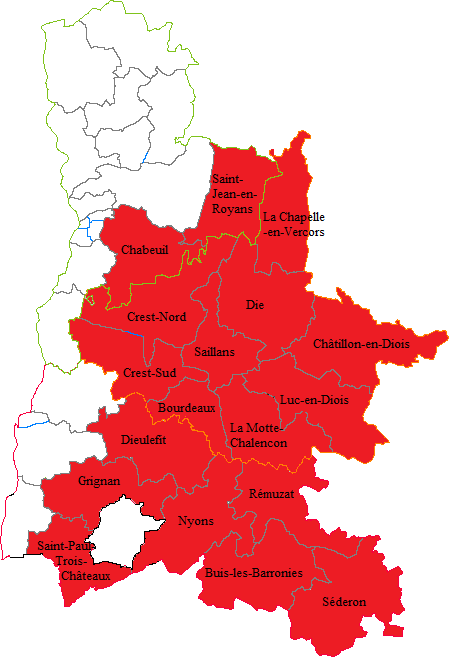
- Boundary of Drôme's 3rd constituency in Drôme

- Drôme in France
- Deputy: Marie Pochon; LE
- Department: Drôme

The 3rd constituency of Drôme is a French legislative constituency in the Drôme département.

== Deputies ==
Election	Member	Party
1993	Hervé Mariton	UDF
1997	Michel Grégoire	PS
2002	Hervé Mariton	UMP
2007	Hervé Mariton	UMP
2012	Hervé Mariton	UMP
2017	Célia de Lavergne	REM
2022	Marie Pochon	EELV
2024	Marie Pochon	LE

== Election results ==
=== 2024 ===
Candidate	Party	Alliance	First round			Second round		
Candidate	Party	Alliance	Votes	%	+/–	Votes	%	+/–
Marie Pochon	LE	NFP	30,618	37.96	+2.47	43,483	56.59	+4.37
Adhémar Autrand	LR-RN	UXD	26,019	32.26	new	33,361	43.41	new
Lander Marchionni	RE	ENS	15,396	19.09	-4.41	WITHDREW		
Patricia Picard	LR		6,855	8.50	-7.37			
Charly Champmartin	LO		908	1.13	+0.11			
Frédérique Simoncini	REC		853	1.06	-2.35			
Votes			80,650	100.00		76,844	100.00	
Valid votes			80,650	97.15	-1.10	76,844	92.00	+0.51
Blank votes			1,584	1.91	+0.61	5,127	6.14	+0.13
Null votes			785	0.95	+0.49	1,556	1.86	-0.64
Turnout			83,019	74.86	+17.12	83,527	75.35	+19.43
Abstentions			27,873	25.14	-17.12	27,321	24.65	-19.43
Registered voters			110,892			110,848		
Source: Ministry of the Interior
Result						LE HOLD		

=== 2022 ===
Legislative Election 2022: Drôme's 3rd constituency
Party	Candidate	Votes	%	±%
EELV (NUPÉS)	Marie Pochon	22,321	35.49	+5.83
LREM (Ensemble)	Célia De Lavergne	14,782	23.50	-9.49
RN	Philippe Dos Reis	10,001	15.90	+2.67
LR (UDC)	Paul Berard	9,986	15.88	−3.55
REC	Virginie Raynal	2,147	3.41	N/A
DVG	Alain Maurice	2,093	3.33	N/A
Others	N/A	1,570		
Turnout		64,034	57.74	+2.35
2nd round result
EELV (NUPÉS)	Marie Pochon	29,635	52.22	
LREM (Ensemble)	Célia De Lavergne	27,118	47.78	−9.21
Turnout		56,753	55.92	+8.82
EELV gain from LREM				

=== 2017 ===
Candidate	Label	First round		Second round	
Candidate	Label	Votes	%	Votes	%
Célia de Lavergne	REM	19,158	32.99	24,518	56.99
Paul Bérard	LR	11,287	19.43	18,506	43.01
Didier Thévenieau	FI	9,725	16.74		
Rachel Reygnier	FN	7,686	13.23		
Pascale Rochas	PS	4,446	7.66		
Martine Morvan	ECO	2,280	3.93		
Chantal Bélézy	PCF	773	1.33		
Gabriel Lacroix	ECO	744	1.28		
Norbert Aguera	DLF	742	1.28		
Frédéric Amandola	ECO	411	0.71		
Brigitte Rousselet	DIV	371	0.64		
Charly Champmartin	EXG	307	0.53		
Rodolphe Dejour	DVD	144	0.25		
Adeline Kargué	DIV	4	0.01		
Votes		58,078	100.00	43,024	100.00
Valid votes		58,078	98.25	43,024	85.60
Blank votes		759	1.28	5,489	10.92
Null votes		276	0.47	1,747	3.48
Turnout		59,113	55.39	50,260	47.10
Abstentions		47,613	44.61	56,453	52.90
Registered voters		106,726		106,713	
Source: Ministry of the Interior

=== 2012 ===
2012 legislative election in Drome's 3rd constituency
Candidate	Party	First round		Second round	
Candidate	Party	Votes	%	Votes	%
Hervé Mariton	UMP	24,111	36.51%	32,913	51.00%
Hervé Rasclard	PS	19,729	29.87%	31,618	49.00%
Laure Pellier	FN	9,548	14.46%		
Corinne Morel Darleux	FG	6,273	9.50%		
Delphine Petit	EELV	3,858	5.84%		
Chantal Fritsch	MoDem	953	1.44%		
Mireille Bertaux	NPA	739	1.12%		
Eméa Vlaemynck	??	578	0.88%		
Thomas Spreux	LO	255	0.39%		
Jean-François Jaquier		3	0.00%		
Valid votes		66,047	98.87%	64,531	97.24%
Spoilt and null votes		752	1.13%	1,831	2.76%
Votes cast / turnout		66,799	65.10%	66,362	64.05%
Abstentions		35,814	34.90%	37,241	35.95%
Registered voters		102,613	100.00%	103,603	100.00%

=== 2007 ===
Legislative Election 2007: Drôme's 3rd constituency
Party	Candidate	Votes	%	±%
UMP	Hervé Mariton	27,779	44.03	
PS	Michel Gergoire	17,263	27.36	
MoDem	François Pegon	4,689	7.43	
LV	Philippe Berrard	3,541	5.61	
FN	Daniel Pelissier	2,836	4.50	
PCF	Joël Mottet	2,815	4.46	
EXG	Gérard Gagnier	1,939	3.07	
Others	N/A	2,227		
Turnout		64,152	65.43	
2nd round result
UMP	Hervé Mariton	33,147	52.62	
PS	Michel Gergoire	29,851	47.38	
Turnout		65,038	66.33	
UMP hold				

=== 2002 ===
Legislative Election 2002: Drôme's 3rd constituency
Party	Candidate	Votes	%	±%
UMP	Hervé Mariton	21,943	35.78	
PS	Michel Grégoire	17,985	29.33	
FN	Christine Alcouffe-Malet	7,187	11.72	
PCF	Jean-Pierre Rambaud	2,890	4.71	
UDF	François Pegon	2,145	3.50	
LV	Pierre Riguet	1,738	2.83	
CPNT	Bernard Bailly	1,649	2.69	
Others	N/A	5,788		
Turnout		62,558	69.25	
2nd round result
UMP	Hervé Mariton	30,258	52.51	
PS	Michel Grégoire	27,366	47.49	
Turnout		57,624	66.33	
UMP gain from PS				

=== 1997 ===
Legislative Election 1997: Drôme's 3rd constituency
Party	Candidate	Votes	%	±%
UDF	Hervé Mariton	18,118	32.92	
PS	Michel Grégoire	14,201	25.80	
FN	Romain Roustan	8,451	15.36	
PCF	Jean-Pierre Rambaud	6,685	12.15	
DVE	Didier Jouve	2,633	4.78	
GE	Paul-Bernard Pruvost	2,226	4.04	
LDI	Hubert Bouyac	1,759	3.20	
DVG	Bernard Denis	962	1.75	
Turnout		55,035	70.45	
2nd round result
PS	Michel Grégoire	29,927	50.90	
UDF	Hervé Mariton	28,870	49.10	
Turnout		58,797	75.49	
PS gain from UDF				

== Sources ==
- Official election results Ministry of the Interior
