= Célia de Lavergne =

French politician

Member of the National Assembly for Drôme's 3rd constituency
- In office 21 June 2017 – 21 June 2022
- Preceded by: Hervé Mariton
- Succeeded by: Marie Pochon

Personal details
- Born: 21 November 1979 (age 46) Clamart, France
- Party: La République En Marche!
- Education: École Polytechnique; École des ponts ParisTech

Célia de Lavergne (French pronunciation: [selja də lavɛʁɲ]; born 21 November 1979) is a French politician of La République En Marche! (LREM) who was elected to the French National Assembly on 18 June 2017, representing the 3rd constituency of the department of Drôme.

== Early career ==
Célia de Lavergne led the Scientific and Technical Association for Water and the Environment (ASTEE) from 2011 until 2014. From 2014 until 2016, she worked as advisor on sustainable development and the smart city to Deputy Mayor of Paris Jean-Louis Missika, in the city government led by Mayor Anne Hidalgo.

== Political career ==
In parliament, de Lavergne has been serving as member of the Committee on Economic Affairs since 2017. From 2018 until 2019, she was her parliamentary group's coordinator on the committee. From 2019 until 2020, she was also a member of the Committee on Sustainable Development and Spatial Planning. She is the parliament's rapporteur on the roll-out of fiber-optic communication in France.

In addition, de Lavergne is part of the French Parliamentary Friendship Group with São Tomé and Príncipe.

She lost her seat in the 2022 French legislative election.

== Political positions ==
In July 2019, de Lavergne voted in favor of the French ratification of the European Union’s Comprehensive Economic and Trade Agreement (CETA) with Canada.

== See also ==
- 2017 French legislative election
