= Albert Decrais =

French politician (1838–1915)

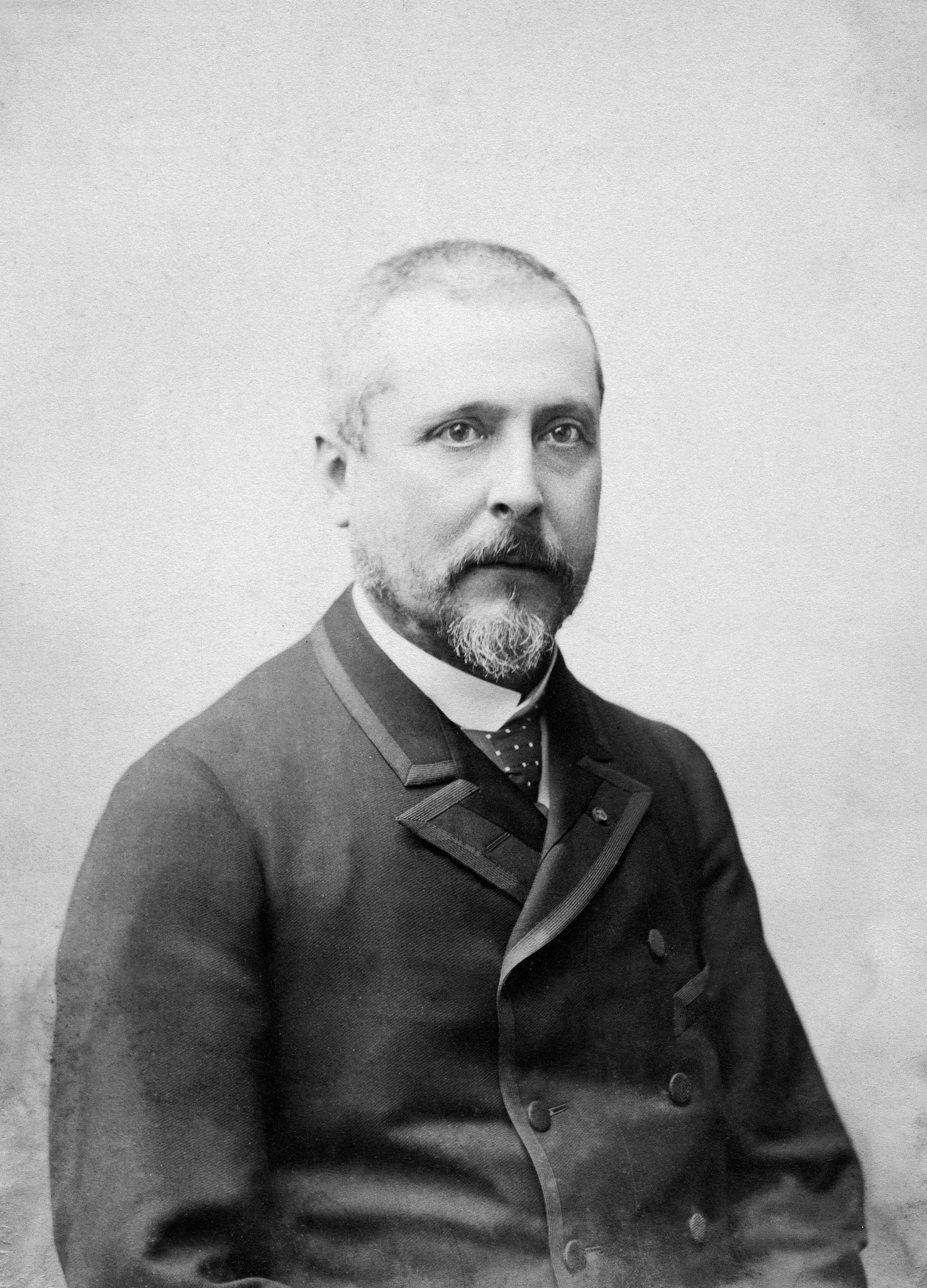
- Decrais by Paul Boyer

Minister of the Colonies
- In office 22 June 1899 – 3 June 1902
- Prime Minister: Pierre Waldeck-Rousseau
- Preceded by: Florent Guillain
- Succeeded by: Gaston Doumergue

Personal details
- Born: 18 December 1838 Bordeaux, Gironde, France
- Died: 27 February 1915 (aged 76) Mérignac, Gironde, France

Pierre Louis Albert Decrais (18 December 1838 – 27 February 1915) was a French lawyer, administrator, diplomat and politician who was a deputy from 1897 to 1903, then a senator from 1903 to 1915. He was Minister of the Colonies from 1899 to 1902. He supported the exploitation of the colonies by concessionary companies, and opposed the slave trade. During his term in office a volcanic eruption destroyed the city of Saint-Pierre, Martinique.

== Early years ==
Albert Pierre Louis Decrais was born on 18 December 1838 in Bordeaux, Gironde. He was from a bourgeois Protestant family. His parents were Louis Decrais, a merchant, and Marie Désirée Debans. He graduated from the lycée in Bordeaux on 3 August 1857, then went to Paris to study law, where he was a brilliant student. He was secretary of the conference of attorneys in 1862–63, and won a prize for his Éloge de M. de Vatimesnil. He joined the bar of Paris and became a licensed attorney in 1867. He was opposed to the Second French Empire and moved in Republican circles.

== Official career ==
During the Franco-Prussian War Decrais was part of the diplomatic mission of Tachard in Brussels. On 2 March 1871 he was named prefect of Indre-et-Loire. He married Marguerite Alice Dethomas, and they had three children. In August 1874 he was decorated with the Legion of Honour. On 11 November 1874 he was made prefect of the Alpes-Maritimes, and on 21 March 1876 he was appointed prefect of the Gironde. He resigned on 19 May 1877 in protest against the selection of Albert, 4th duc de Broglie as prime minister. He was reinstated on 20 December 1877, and on 7 February 1878 was promoted to Officer of the Legion of Honor. He was appointed Councilor of State on 16 March 1879.

== Diplomat ==
Decrais was appointed Minister Plenipotentiary in Brussels on 8 May 1880. From 4 February 1882 to 11 November 1882 he was director of political affairs at the Foreign Ministry under the 2nd cabinet of Charles de Freycinet. He was appointed French ambassador to Italy on 11 November 1882, to Austria on 17 July 1886 and was appointed ambassador to Great Britain on 21 July 1893. He retired from the diplomatic service in 1894.

== Political career ==
=== Deputy ===
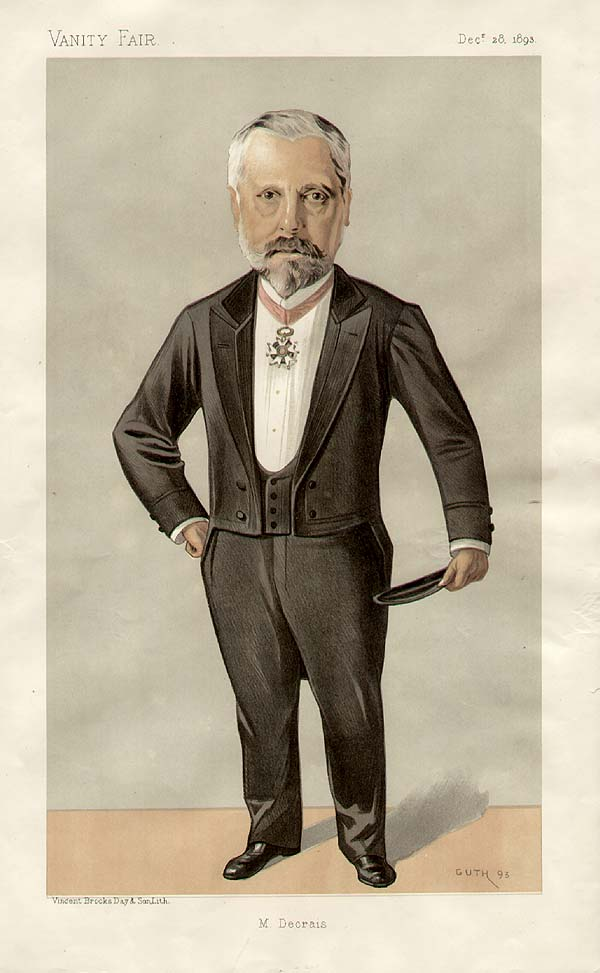
Cartoon of Decrais from Vanity Fair, 28 December 1893

From 1880 to 1886 Decrais was a member of the general council of the Gironde. He ran for election to the legislature in 1896 for the 1st district of Bordeaux, but did not succeed. He ran as Republican candidate in a by-election for the 4th district of Bordeaux on 21 February 1897, and was elected. He was reelected on 8 May 1898 and 27 April 1902. In the chamber he was interested only in foreign affairs.

=== Minister of the Colonies ===
Decrais was Minister of the Colonies from 22 June 1899 to 3 June 1902 in the cabinet of Pierre Waldeck-Rousseau. He stated that he was in favor of a humane policy towards the natives of the colonies. Decrais supported the system by which companies were given concessions to exploit areas of the colonies in exchange for paying taxes and developing their areas. The number of concessions increased under his administration. The colonial governors were often hostile to concessions where the companies were only concerned with maximizing profit, and which were harmful in the long run. The companies themselves generally did poorly despite government loans. However, Decrais ignored these issues. In 1901 he set up a banking commission to look at ways of financing the companies, with the end result that taxpayers paid the salaries and dividends of the exploiting companies.

In October 1899 Decrais reorganized the Sudan so that the southern cercles were attached to the coastal colonies. In the interior there were two colonies under military rule, centered on Ouagadougou and Timbuktu respectively. A new military territory covering what is now Niger was established in 1900. On 11 December 1899 the Catholic deputy Jules Auguste Lemire spoke in the Chamber on the persistent slave trade, particularly in women. Decrais said he was not aware of the problem but would ensure that slavery was suppressed. Soon after he wrote a strongly worded letter to all governors in which he said,

It is important then to the progress of civilization and the honor of our country that natives are led to completely renounce the practice of slavery in all territories over which our control is established. It is especially important that the slave trade, their export from one country to another, confront a surveillance and a repression of such severity that where it still exists, it disappears as soon as possible.
I do not need to add that I rely on your prudence and experience, to consider in the measures you will have to take, the temperament, the customs and the traditions of the natives placed under your administration.

Early in May 1902 the volcano Mount Pelée above the city of Saint-Pierre, Martinique began to erupt. Decrais received a cable from senator Amédée Knight on 7 May 1902 that said serious damage had been done and asked for humanitarian help. Decrais sensed that the problem was not urgent, and the request might have political motives, so did not take immediate action. Later he explained, "With an election pending, the situation was delicate. To intervene at the behest of a party leader would have slighted the governor's authority and could have been interpreted as action for political gain." The eruptions continued, and by 12 May 1902 it was known that Saint-Pierre had been completely destroyed and 30,000 people had died.

=== Senator ===
On 26 April 1903 Decrais was elected to the Senate in a by-election. He was reelected on 7 January 1906. Again, he was almost entirely devoted to foreign affairs. He died on 27 February 1915 in Mérignac, Gironde aged 76.

== Publications ==
- Decrais, Albert (1860), De la minorité, de la tutelle (in French), Paris: C. de Mourgues, p. 64
- Decrais, Albert (1864), Éloge de M. de Vatimesnil, prononcé à la conférence des avocats, le... 19 décembre 1863 (in French), Paris: Pagnerre, p. 45
- Decrais, Albert; Delabarre, H L E (1890), Les Conditions du travail en Autriche-Hongrie (in French), Paris: Berger-Levrault, p. 106
- Decrais, Albert (1905), preface, Madagascar : histoire, organisation, colonisation, by You, André, Gallieni, Joseph-Simon, introduction, Paris: Berger-Levrault, p. 636

== Sources ==
- Jolly, Jean (1960–1977). "DECRAIS (ALBERT, PIERRE, LOUIS)". Dictionnaire des parlementaires français; notices biographiques sur les ministres, députés et sénateurs français de 1889 à 1940 (in French). Paris: Presses universitaires de France. ISBN 2-1100-1998-0.
- Dubos, Joël (1998), "DECRAIS Pierre, Louis, Albert 1838–1915", Dictionnaire des parlementaires d'Aquitaine sous la Troisième République, Presses Univ de Bordeaux, ISBN 978-2-86781-231-6
- Klein, Martin A. (1998-07-28), Slavery and Colonial Rule in French West Africa, Cambridge University Press, ISBN 978-0-521-59678-7
- Persell, Stuart Michael (1983), French Colonial Lobby 1889-1938, Hoover Press, ISBN 978-0-8179-7833-4
- Zebrowski, Ernest (2002), The Last Days of St. Pierre: The Volcanic Disaster that Claimed Thirty Thousand Lives, Rutgers University Press, ISBN 978-0-8135-3041-3
