= Hervé Mariton =

French politician (born 1958)

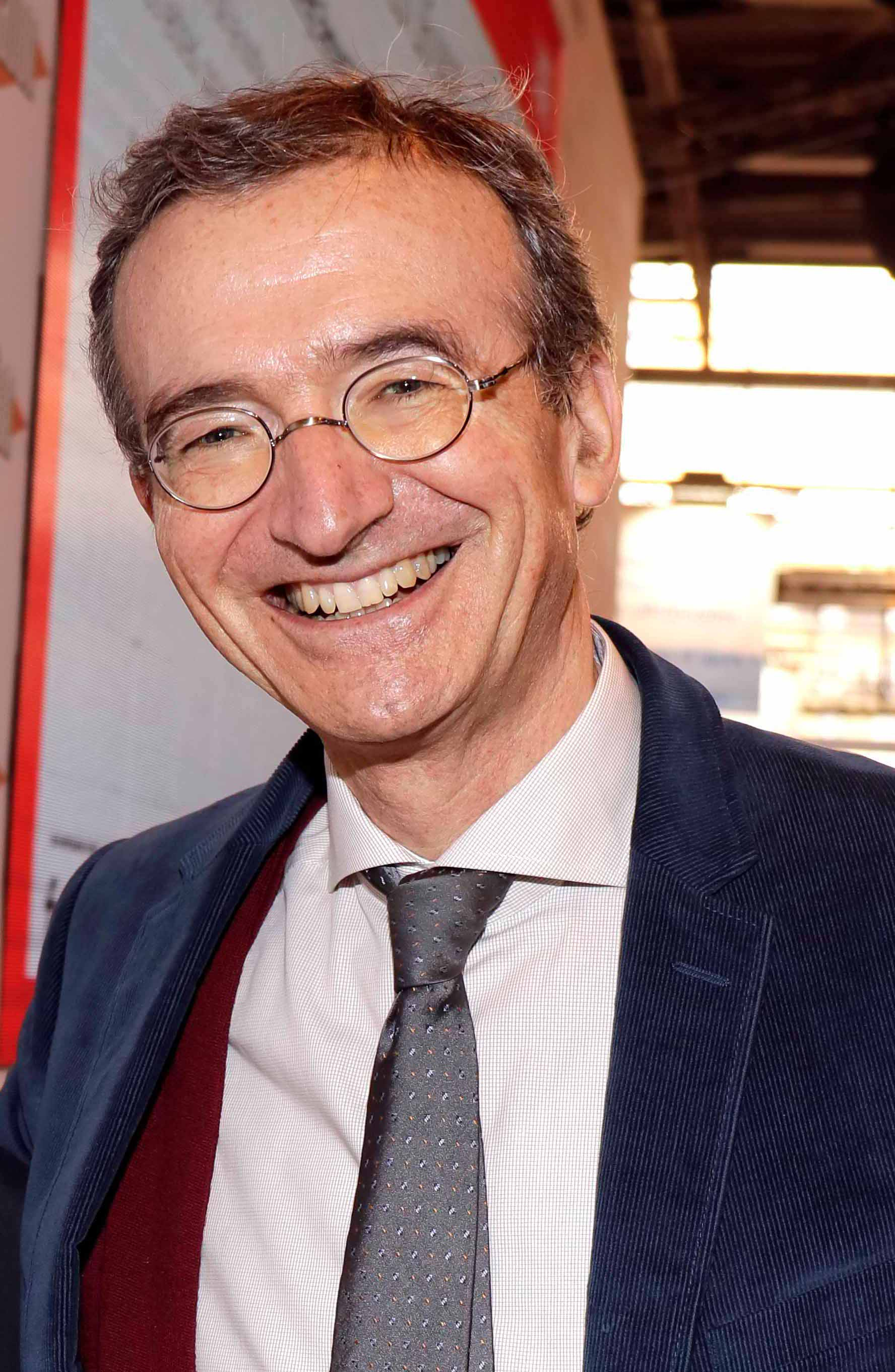

Mayor of Crest
- Incumbent
- Assumed office 24 June 1995
- Preceded by: Jean-Pierre Tabardel

Minister of the Overseas
- In office 27 March 2007 – 15 May 2007
- President: Jacques Chirac
- Preceded by: François Baroin
- Succeeded by: Michèle Alliot-Marie

Member of the National Assembly for Drôme's 3rd constituency
- In office 20 June 2007 – 20 June 2017
- Preceded by: Fabien Limonta
- Succeeded by: Célia de Lavergne
- In office 19 June 2002 – 26 April 2007
- Preceded by: Michel Grégoire
- Succeeded by: Fabien Limonta
- In office 2 April 1993 – 21 April 1997
- Preceded by: Henri Michel
- Succeeded by: Michel Grégoire

Personal details
- Born: Hervé Marie David Mariton; 5 November 1958 (age 67) Algiers, French Algeria
- Party: Republican Party (until 1997); Liberal Democracy (1997–2002); Union for a Popular Movement (2002–2015); The Republicans (since 2015)
- Education: Lycée Louis-le-Grand
- Alma mater: École Polytechnique; Paris Dauphine University; Sciences Po

Hervé Marie David Mariton (French pronunciation: [ɛʁve maʁi david maʁitɔ̃]; born 5 November 1958) is a French politician serving as Mayor of Crest since 1995. A member of The Republicans, he was elected to the National Assembly for the third constituency of Drôme from 1993 to 1997 and again from 2002 until 2017, with a brief interruption in 2007, when he was appointed Minister of the Overseas by President Jacques Chirac in the last weeks of his second term, replacing François Baroin, who became Minister of the Interior.

== Political career ==
A member of the Corps des mines, Mariton was elected to the municipal council of Chevreuse, Yvelines in 1983 and the Regional council of Rhône-Alpes in 1986. In 1989, he became a municipal councillor in Crest. He was national secretary in the Republican Party that was dissolved in 1997 and later in Liberal Democracy, established the same year. In 1998, he was a candidate for president of the Union for French Democracy, receiving 10% of the vote against François Bayrou.

He served as a member of the National Assembly from 1993 until 1997, when he lost his reelection bid. He returned to Parliament in 2002, winning reelection in 2007 and 2012. He represented the third constituency of the Drôme department. He joined the newly-established Union for a Popular Movement in 2002, which became The Republicans in 2015. From March to May 2007, he served as Minister of the Overseas under Prime Minister Dominique de Villepin. As Nicolas Sarkozy had resigned as Interior Minister to run for President of France, Overseas Minister François Baroin was appointed to succeed him.

From 1995 to 1997 and again from 2002 until 2017, Mariton served on the Committee on Finance, Economic Affairs and Budgetary Control. During his time in national politics, he was widely seen as a critic of President Sarkozy from 2007 onwards. Although being part of The Reformers, a liberal faction within the party, he opposed the passage of Law 2013-404, which legalised same-sex marriage in France. In the 2016 The Republicans presidential primary, he endorsed Alain Juppé. Mariton is fluent in French, English and Russian.

== Other activities ==
Mariton currently serves as:

- Trilateral Commission, Member of the European Group
- Les Plus Beaux Détours de France, President
- Commission Franco-Britannique, President
