= Georges Trouillot =

French politician (1851–1916)

Georges Marie Denis Gabriel Trouillot
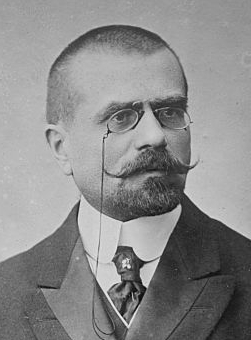

Minister of the Colonies
- In office 28 June 1898 – 26 October 1898
- Prime Minister: Henri Brisson
- Preceded by: Gabriel Hanotaux
- Succeeded by: Florent Guillain

Minister of Industry, Commerce and Posts
- In office 7 June 1902 – 18 January 1905
- Prime Minister: Émile Combes
- Preceded by: Alexandre Millerand
- Succeeded by: Fernand Dubief

Minister of Industry, Commerce and Posts
- In office 12 November 1905 – 9 March 1906
- Prime Minister: Maurice Rouvier
- Preceded by: Fernand Dubief
- Succeeded by: Gaston Doumergue Commerce & Industry); Louis Barthou (PTT)

Minister of the Colonies
- In office 24 July 1909 – 2 November 1910
- Prime Minister: Aristide Briand
- Preceded by: Raphaël Milliès-Lacroix
- Succeeded by: Jean Morel

Personal details
- Born: 7 May 1851 Champagnole, Jura, France
- Died: 20 November 1916 (aged 65) Paris, France

Georges Marie Denis Gabriel Trouillot (French pronunciation: [ʒɔʁʒ maʁi dəni ɡabʁijɛl tʁujo]; 7 May 1851 – 20 November 1916) was a French Radical politician. He played a central role in developing the law of 1901 that governed associations such as agricultural cooperative. He was Minister of the Colonies in 1898 and again in 1909–10. He was Minister of Industry, Commerce and Posts in 1902–05 and again in 1905–06. He published several books, including both poetry and political subjects.

== Early years (1851–89) ==
Georges Marie Denis Gabriel Trouillot was born on 7 May 1851 in Champagnole, Jura. He studied classics at the Jesuit college in Dole, then studied law in Lyon. He became an attorney in Lons-le-Saunier. On 2 August 1870 he was appointed sub-lieutenant in the National Mobile Guard of the Jura department. He was one of the founders of the Jura Republican Union. He was a member of the general council of Jura for the canton of Beaufort, then municipal councilor in 1877. He was elected mayor of Lons-le-Saunier. In 1889 he was named president of the Bar.

== National politics (1889–1916) ==
=== Deputy ===
Trouillot ran in the general election of 1889, and was elected in the first round for the constituency of Lons-le-Saunier. He joined the Union of Progressives and Radical Left in the chamber. He was also elected president of the Jura departmental assembly. He was reelected deputy in 1893 and in 1898. In 1891 Trouillot proposed a law against abortion and contraception. Discussion was long delayed, and the proposal was not passed by the Senate until January 1919.

Trouillot introduced a bill to let anyone who held the degree of licence en droit practice as an avocat, removing the authority of the Order of Advocates to approve new members of their profession. In response, the Paris Order struck him off their register. The case went to court and Trouillot was reinstated on the basis that the disbarment hearings had not followed due process. The decision caused outrage among the leading advocates. Trouillot assisted René Viviani in introduction of the law of 1 December 1900 that allowed women to practice as advocates following a campaign by Jeanne Chauvin, who became the second woman to be admitted to the profession.

=== Minister of Colonies ===
The public scandal of the Dreyfus Affair blew up in January 1898 with Émile Zola's publication in L'Aurore of his open letter entitled J'Accuse…!. Trouillot accused the premier Jules Méline of practicing the politics of division. Méline resigned during the debate of 14 June 1898. Trouillot was appointed to the new Radical government formed late that month. He was Minister of the Colonies in the second cabinet of Henri Brisson, and held office from 28 June 1898 to 26 October 1898.

Trouillot saw little value in the French enclaves in India, and told the Foreign Minister that he would be willing to give them all to the British in exchange for the Gambia. The Polynesian island of Mangareva was more important to him than the French possessions in India. His views were not shared by the inhabitants of Mahé, who said it was capable of "rivaling in salubriousness with the best of sanatoriums of the Presidency of Madras."

This was a time of rapid colonial expansion in Africa, where officers were given much freedom of action as long as they succeeded in acquiring territory. Trouillot said in a speech in 1898, "Let us give ourselves a birth incentive so that we can once again become the world's foremost colonizing people." In a decree of 7 August 1898 Trouillot created an office of financial control for French West Africa under the direction of the governor-general. This gave the colonialist a significant increase in independence from the metropolitan government.

In July Trouillot wrote to the Minister of Foreign Affairs, Théophile Delcassé, that Major Jean-Baptiste Marchand was approaching Fashoda on the Nile, and the British general Herbert Kitchener would soon also arrive there. Delcassé did not reply until September, when he said Marchand should return before reaching Fashoda. By that time it was too late to prevent the encounter, so the letter was mainly so that the French could disavow Marchand if things went wrong, as it did in the Fashoda Incident.

=== Law of Associations ===
Trouillot played a central role in developing the Law of Associations. He was rapporteur for all the parliamentary debates on this law, working closely with the head of government, Pierre Waldeck-Rousseau. The law defined the legal status of associations such as mutual societies and agricultural cooperatives, and was developed through study of associations in the Jura, elsewhere in Europe and in the United States. According to Trouillot, hostility to religious congregations had always been the reason why efforts to allow freedom of association had failed in the past,

The triumph of the cause of freedom of association has been delayed in the Chambers by the perpetual conflict between those who demand the privilege or unlimited advantages of this freedom for the congregations and those who see in its extension to the congregations the greatest danger to civil society. All the bills filed over the past thirty years bear traces of these concerns. Only eleven of them insisted on absolute conceptual equality between lay associations and religious congregations. All the others allowed for special precautions in dealing with the latter... These precautions themselves demonstrate the difficulty of the problem and explain the delay in finding a solution... The thesis that the congregations are to be treated under a special regime is neither Jacobin nor Republican. In view of the social and economic perils that excessive growth of such associations represents, all our regimes, whether of old France or of the Revolution, have repeatedly warned against them. In every one of these periods mistakes may have been made concerning the effectiveness of the precautions taken, but there has never been any mistake about the need to protect both persons and property against this awesomely expansive power.

Trouillot's answer was to curb the powers of associations to prevent abuse. The law required almost all the religious orders and congregations in France to obtain legal authorization from parliament, and disallowed any member of an unauthorized order or congregation from teaching or managing a school. The Law of Associations was passed in July 1901. The church complained that the law resulted in a cascade of closures of schools and ecclesiastical establishments.

=== Other activities ===
Trouillot was Minister of Industry, Commerce and Posts from 7 June 1902 to 18 January 1905 in the cabinet of Émile Combes. Trouillot, who was known for his anti-clericalism, followed a traditional policy in dealing with industrial issues. In March 1904 his predecessor Alexandre Millerand complained that his social program had been replaced by a program of "monk-hunting". However, during a strike of textile workers in the fall of 1903 Trouillot agreed in substance with the strikers' complaints against the manufacturers, and the Chamber voted almost unanimously for arbitration to resume, and for a thorough inquiry into the textile industry. Trouillot was again Minister of Industry, Commerce and Posts from 12 November 1905 to 9 March 1906 in the second cabinet of Maurice Rouvier.

Trouillot was elected Senator for the Jura on 7 January 1906. He was again Minister of the Colonies from 24 July 1909 to 2 November 1910 in the cabinet of Aristide Briand. On 31 May 1910 he decreed that the administrators of French Equatorial Africa had the power to adjudicate offenses committed by the indigenous people that could not be tried by the French courts. Through his influence, most young men in the Jura were posted to the nearby garrisons at Lons-le-Saunier and Bourg for their military service. An unplanned consequence was that at the outbreak of World War I (1914–18) the department suffered disproportionate losses. Trouillot's canton of Beaufort suffered particularly large losses.

Georges Trouillot died in Paris on 20 November 1916. His daughter married the future colonial administrator Lucien Saint.

== Publications ==
Trouillot was a distinguished man of letters, and published several books. These included Du contrat d'association (1902) and Pour l'idée laïque (1906). He also contributed to several journals, notably Voltaire and Le Siècle. Composer Jeanne Rivet used his text for her song “En Partant pour la Guerre.”

- Viviani; Georges Trouillot; Waldeck-Rousseau; Brisson (1901). La Loi sur les associations, discours prononcés à la Chambre des députés [les 15, 17, 21 et 27 janvier 1901 (in French). Troyes: impr. de G. Arbouin. p. 32.
- Fernand Chapsal; Georges Trouillot (1902). Du Contrat d'association, commentaire de la loi du 1er juillet 1901 et des règlements d'administration publique du 16 août suivant (in French). Paris: bureaux des "Lois nouvelles". p. 504.
- Georges Trouillot (1906). Pour l'idée laïque (in French). Léon Bourgeois, preface. Paris: E. Fasquelle. p. 312.
- Georges Trouillot (1912-09-25). "La Réforme électorale au Sénat". La Grande revue (in French). Paris: 23.
- Georges Trouillot (1915). Pour nos soldats (in French). Lons-le-Saunier: impr. C. Verpillat. p. 63.
- Georges Trouillot (1916). Gavroche et Flambeau: poèmes de guerre (in French). Paris: E. Fasquelle. p. 189.
- Georges Trouillot (1919). Poèmes familiers (in French). Lucie Delarue-Mardrus, preface; Th. Chartran, portrait of the author. Paris: E. Fasquelle. p. 102.

== Sources ==
- Animesh Rai (2007). The Legacy of French Rule in India (1674--1954): An Investigation of a Process of Creolization. ISBN 978-0-549-23522-4.
- Cook Andersen, Margaret (2015-01-01). Regeneration Through Empire: French Pronatalists and Colonial Settlement in the Third Republic. U of Nebraska Press. ISBN 978-0-8032-6525-7.
- Gide, André; Rouart, Eugène (2006). Correspondance. Presses Universitaires Lyon. ISBN 978-2-7297-0795-8.
- Goldberg, Harvey (1962). The Life of Jean Jaurès. Univ of Wisconsin Press. ISBN 978-0-299-02564-9.
- Jolly, Jean (1960–1977). "Trouillot (Georges, Marie, Denis, Gabriel)". Dictionnaire des parlementaires français (1889–1940). Paris: Presses universitaires de France. ISBN 2-1100-1998-0.
- Laloy, Vincent (1986-01-01). Chronique intime d'une famille franc-comtoise au 19e siècle. Presses Univ. Franche-Comté. GGKEY:C2QL595DRW4.
- Lanne, Bernard (1998-01-01). Histoire politique du Tchad de 1945 à 1958: administration, partis, élections (in French). KARTHALA Editions. ISBN 978-2-86537-883-8.
- "Le député jurassien, Georges Trouillot : l'artisan de la loi 1901". Voix du Jura (in French). 2001-06-28.
- Mayeur, Jean-Marie; Rebirioux, Madeleine; Foster, J. R. (1987). The Third Republic from Its Origins to the Great War, 1871-1914. Cambridge University Press. ISBN 978-0-521-35857-6.
- Persell, Stuart Michael (1983). "Establishment of Administrative Power". French Colonial Lobby 1889-1938. Hoover Press. ISBN 978-0-8179-7833-4.
- Roberts, Mary Louise (2009-02-15). Civilization without Sexes: Reconstructing Gender in Postwar France, 1917-1927. University of Chicago Press. ISBN 978-0-226-72127-9.
- Rosanvallon, Pierre (2007). The Demands of Liberty: Civil Society in France Since the Revolution. Harvard University Press. ISBN 978-0-674-02496-0.
- Savage, John (2003-04-14). "The Problems of Wealth and Virtue: The Paris Bar and the Generation of the Fin-de-Siècle". In W Wesley Pue, David Sugarman (ed.). Lawyers and Vampires: Cultural Histories of Legal Professions. Bloomsbury Publishing. ISBN 978-1-84731-156-6.
- Schultz, Kenneth A. (2001-07-26). Democracy and Coercive Diplomacy. Cambridge University Press. ISBN 978-0-521-79669-9.
- Sutton, Michael (2002-06-20). Nationalism, Positivism and Catholicism: The Politics of Charles Maurras and French Catholics 1890-1914. Cambridge University Press. ISBN 978-0-521-89340-4.
- Taithe, Bertrand (2009-10-22). The Killer Trail: A Colonial Scandal in the Heart of Africa. OUP Oxford. ISBN 978-0-19-162276-2.
- Weber, Eugen (1991). My France: Politics, Culture, Myth. Harvard University Press. p. 373. ISBN 978-0-674-59576-7.
