= Claude Bodin =

French politician

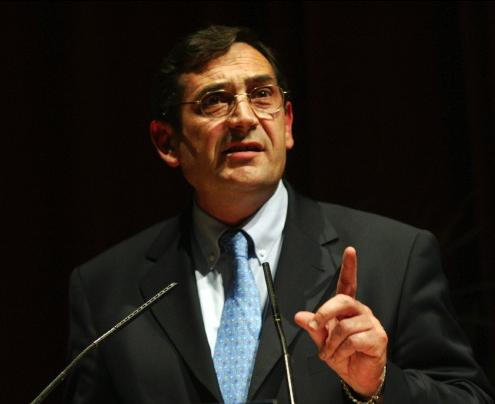

Claude Bodin (born 15 May 1952 in Versailles) is a member of the National Assembly of France and represents the Val-d'Oise department. He is a member of the Union for a Popular Movement.
