= Union technique de l'électricité et de la communication =

French organization for standardization in electronics

The Union Technique de l'Electricité et de la Communication (UTE) is the French national organisation for normalisation in the domain of electronics. It is a member of the International Electrotechnical Commission and of the CENELEC.

It was founded in 1907 as the Union des syndicats de l'électricité from a merger of the Syndicat professionnel des industries électriques and the Syndicat professionnel des usines d'électricité.

Florent Guillain was one of the first presidents.
