= Ernest Boulanger (politician) =

French economist and politician

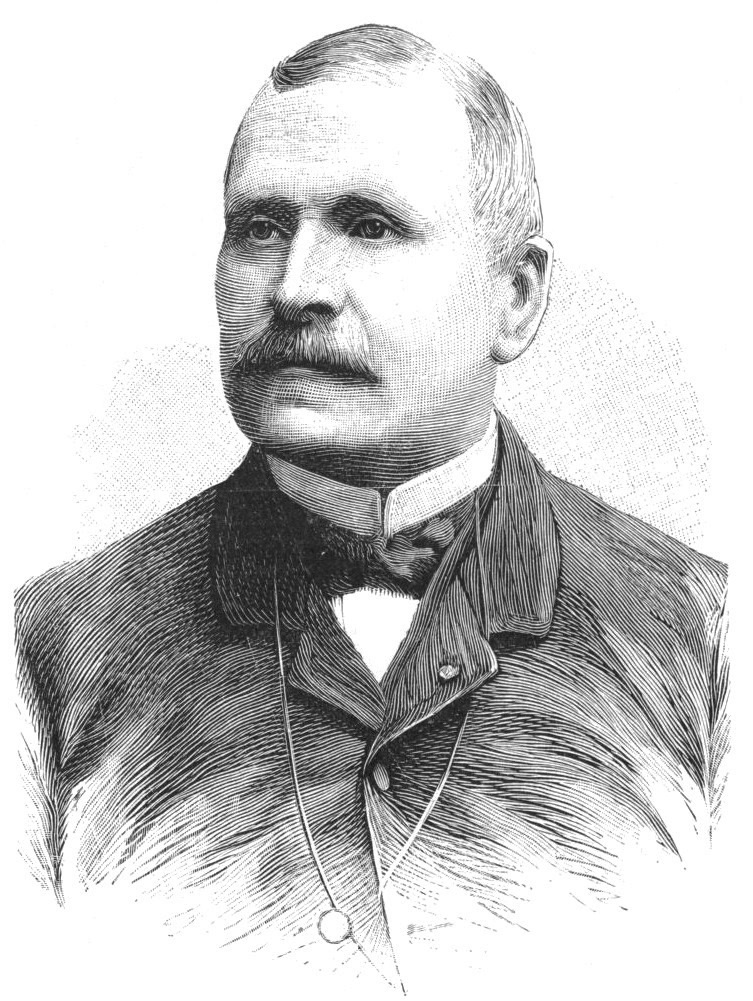
Boulanger, Ernest Theophile

Ernest Boulanger (12 October 1831 in Nantillois, Meuse – 19 October 1907 in Paris) was a French politician and economist.

Senator of the Meuse from 1886 to 1907, he participated very actively in the budget discussions. For many years he served as vice-president of the Committee on Finance.

He was Minister of the Colonies from 20 March to 29 May 1894 in the government Jean Casimir-Perier and the first President of the Court of Auditors from 1896 to 1900. He was also Chairman of the Board of the General Omnibus Company, from 1890 to 1894 and from 1900 to 1907.
