= Naïma Moutchou =

French politician (born 1980)

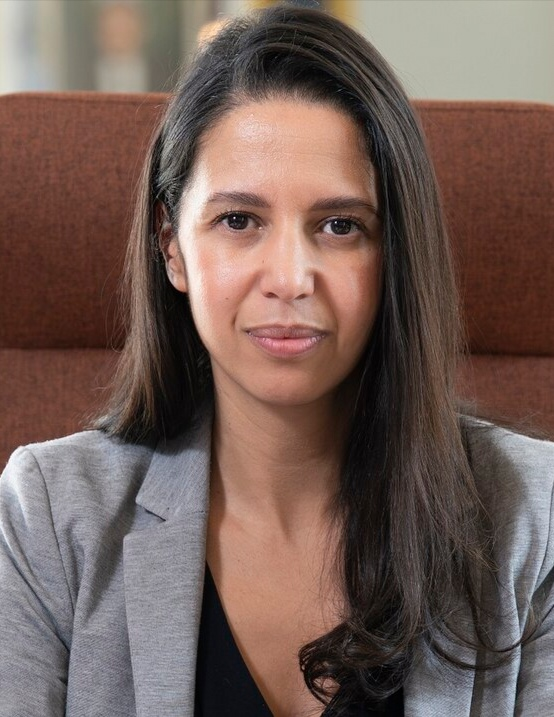
- Moutchou in 2025

Minister of the Overseas
- Incumbent
- Assumed office 12 October 2025
- Prime Minister: Sébastien Lecornu
- Preceded by: Manuel Valls

Minister for Civil Service Transformation, Artificial Intelligence and Digital Technology
- In office 5 October 2025 – 12 October 2025
- Prime Minister: Sébastien Lecornu
- Preceded by: Clara Chappaz (artificial intelligence and digital technology, as a delegated minister); Laurent Marcangeli (civil service)
- Succeeded by: David Amiel (civil service, as a delegated minister); Anne Le Hénanff (artificial intelligence and digital, as a delegated minister)

Vice-President of the National Assembly
- In office 29 June 2022 – 1 October 2025
- President: Yaël Braun-Pivet
- Preceded by: Laetitia Saint-Paul
- Succeeded by: Nadège Abomangoli

Member of the National Assembly
- Incumbent
- Assumed office 21 June 2017
- Preceded by: Gérard Sebaoun
- Succeeded by: Benoît Blanchard
- Parliamentary group: LREM (2017-2022); HOR (since 2022)
- Constituency: Val-d'Oise's 4th constituency

Personal details
- Born: 4 November 1980 (age 46) Ermont, France
- Party: Horizons (2021–present)
- Other political affiliations: Renaissance (2016–2021)
- Education: Cergy-Pontoise University

Naïma Moutchou (French: [naima mutʃu]; born 4 November 1980) is a French lawyer and politician of Horizons currently serving as Minister of the Overseas in the second Lecornu government. She briefly served as Minister of the Transformation of Civil Service, Artificial Intelligence and Digital Technology in his first government.

From the 2017 elections until 2025, Moutchou served as a member of the National Assembly, representing the department of Val-d'Oise. During that time, she also served as a Vice-President of the National Assembly between 2022 and 2025.

== Early life and education ==
Moutchou was born in November 1980 to a middle-class family of Moroccan origin. Her father worked at the local hospital and her mother was a nursery. She was born in Ermont and raised in Franconville.

From 2010, Moutchou practiced business and media law for nearly ten years. At the same time, she volunteered as a lawyer with International League against Racism and Anti-Semitism (LICRA).

== Political career ==
=== Member of the National Assembly, 2017–2025 ===
In parliament, Moutchou served on the Committee on Legal Affairs, where she was her parliamentary group's coordinator from 2017 until 2019. In this capacity, she was the parliament's rapporteur on legislation combating fake news in November 2018.

In addition to her committee assignments, Moutchou is a member of the French-Moroccan Parliamentary Friendship Group and the French-Serbian Parliamentary Friendship Group. From 2018 until 2021, she was also one of six Assembly members who serve as judges of the Cour de Justice de la République.

After Amélie de Montchalin's appointment to the government of Prime Minister Édouard Philippe in March 2019, Moutchou briefly served as first vice chair of the LREM parliamentary group under the leadership of chairman Gilles Le Gendre; she was replaced by Marie Lebec in September 2019.

In addition to LREM, Moutchou joined the Horizons party in 2021.

From 2022 to 2025, Moutchou served as a vice-president of the National Assembly, under the leadership of president Yaël Braun-Pivet.

=== Career in government ===
On 5 October 2025, Moutchou was appointed Minister for Public Sector Transformation, Artificial Intelligence and Digital Affairs in the short-lived Lecornu government. Her appointment reflected an emphasis on digital modernization within public administration, but she left office following the government's resignation on 6 October 2025, only hours after its formation.

On 12 October 2025, she was appointed Minister of the Overseas in the Lecornu's second government.

== Political positions ==
In July 2019, Moutchou voted in favor of the French ratification of the European Union's Comprehensive Economic and Trade Agreement (CETA) with Canada.

== Other activities ==
- National Institute for Advanced Studies in Security and Justice (INHESJ), Member of the Board of Directors (2017–2020)

== See also ==
- 2017 French legislative election
