= Revolution of Jobs =

Political measures taken in France

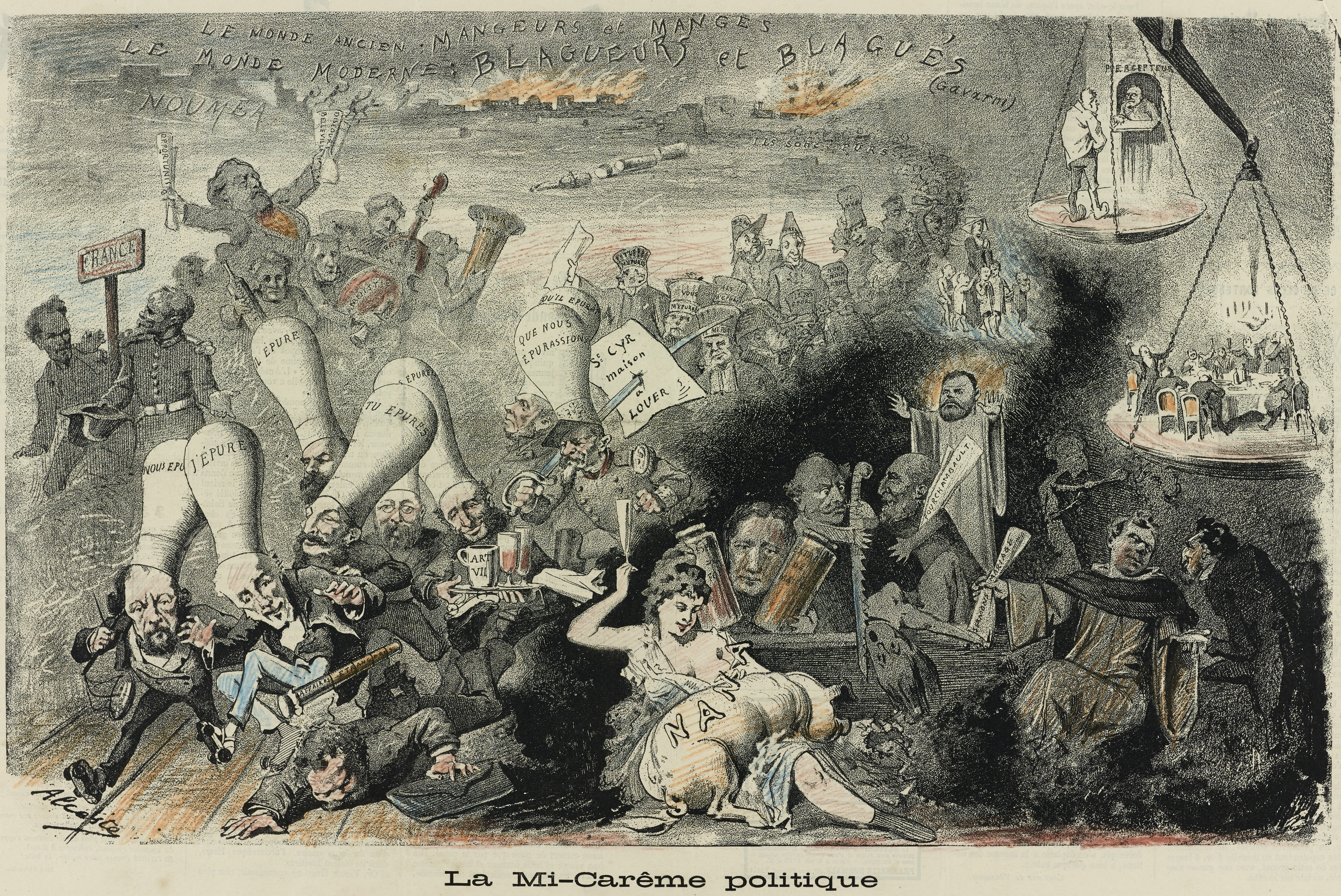
La Mi-Carême politique, cartoon published in the first illustrated supplement of the monarchist newspaper Le Gaulois (6 March 1880). In the left foreground, the ministers of the Freycinet government glide by, conjugating the verb "to purify", followed by "the whole rabble of people who have exploited purification."

The purge of the French Civil Service between 1879 and 1884, also known as the revolution of jobs, refers to a series of political measures taken in France by the Republicans at the beginning of the Third Republic. These measures were designed to cleanse the administration, army, and judiciary of their most conservative members. This purge was not the first to be experienced by the regime; others had occurred in 1870, 1871, 1876, and 1877.

In the aftermath of the crisis that unfolded on 16 May 1877, and the subsequent legislative elections, the monarchists lost control of the Chamber of Deputies to the Republicans. This shift in political power was met with a reciprocal change in the conservative government, as evidenced by the Republican purge of December 1877, which had a particularly pronounced impact on the prefectural corps. Following the Republican victory in the 1879 senatorial elections, the new majority demanded a more thorough purge of the administration. This resulted in a new period of purges that profoundly renewed the personnel of the Third Republic. The aim was to remove all officials suspected of collusion with the Moral Order and to prevent the administration from opposing the legislature directives. This purge affected institutions regularly subjected to cleansing during periods of regime change, including public prosecutors, generals, the Council of State, the judiciary, police, ministry directors, diplomats abroad, and the financial administration and judiciary. It is notable for its unprecedented intensity in the 19th century. The purges concluded in 1883–1884 under the second Ferry government, which saw the removal of numerous judges in a process that disregarded the principle of security of tenure. This event is regarded as one of the harshest in the history of the French judicial system.

The period of civil service purges, directed against conservatives and Catholics, they had the effect of consolidating the regime and the domination of moderate Republicans over it. However, it also contributed to the marginalization of certain groups, such as Catholic jurists, who were forced into opposition. These individuals would go on to provide cadres for resistance to the secularization of society and anti-Republican movements like Action Française.

== Political context ==
=== "Republic of the dukes" ===
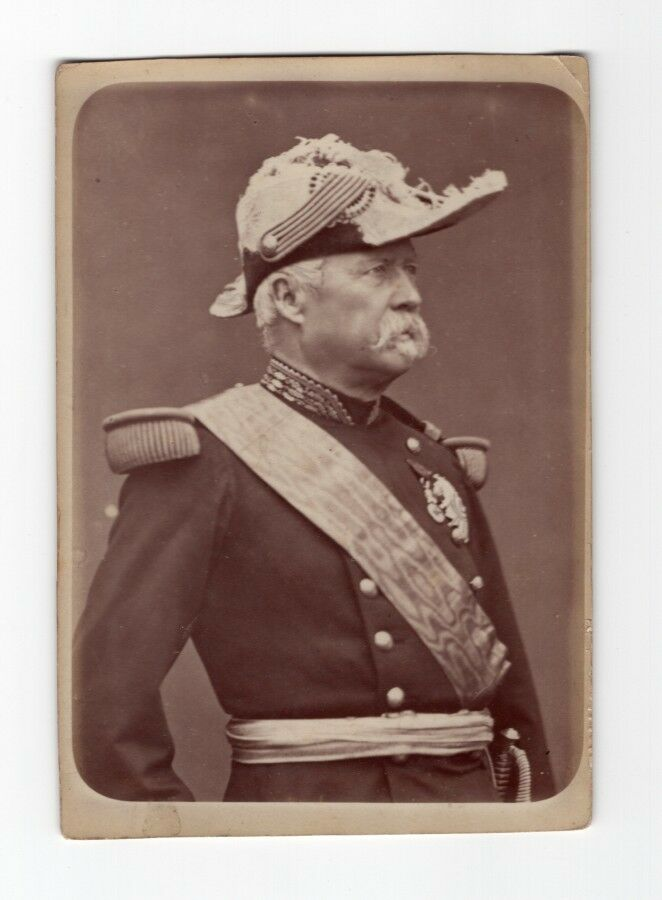
Marshal Patrice de Mac Mahon, President of the Republic from 1873 to 1879.

In the aftermath of the Franco-Prussian War of 1870, which resulted in the demise of the Second Empire, the Third Republic was largely influenced by royalists. They regarded the Republic as a provisional regime, destined to pave the way for reinstating a legitimist or Orleanist claimant to the throne. To facilitate this transition, the royalists elected Marshal MacMahon as the head of the regime in the 1873 election, with the title of President of the French Republic. However, the two royalist factions could not reach a consensus and voted in November 1873 to establish a seven-year term, extending MacMahon's presidency. It was hoped that the crisis could be resolved by the end of his term.

The rise of Bonapartism in the partial elections of 1874 altered the political landscape. Both the Republicans and royalists endorsed the constitutional laws of 1875. These texts established the fundamental principles of the Republic. Even though their drafters had intended them to govern a transitional regime, they served as the Constitution until its dissolution in 1940.

=== Crisis of 16 May 1877 ===
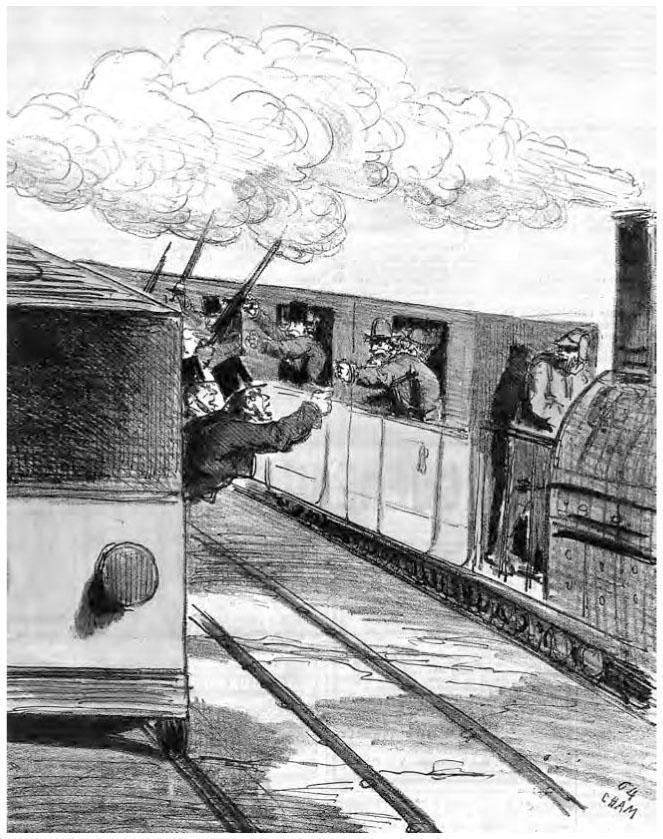
"Rencontre entre deux trains de préfets, aller et retour", drawing by Cham referring to the prefect purges of 1877.

The 1876 legislative elections resulted in a majority for the Republican Party in the Chamber of Deputies. The coexistence between Marshal MacMahon and the majority in the Chamber was fraught with difficulty. Ultimately, ultramontane demonstrations in favor of the restoration of Pope Pius IX's temporal power led to a rupture between the Jules Simon government and the Duke of Magenta. (Note: Nobility title of Patrice de Mac Mahon.) This event, occurring on 16 May 1877, came to be known as the Crisis of 16 May. Following the Constitution, the President of the Republic exercised his right of dissolution and called for new legislative elections. The third de Broglie cabinet dismissed the prefects appointed by Jules Simon and reinstated personnel loyal to the Moral Order. This resulted in 62 prefectural posts changing hands, with half of the prefects being left without positions, and all the sub-prefects being replaced. In total, 1,625 state agents were dismissed, and the government ordered civil servants to facilitate the electoral victory of the conservative majority.

The early elections of October 1877 confirmed the Republican majority, necessitating the appointment of Jules Dufaure as Prime minister by Marshal MacMahon. On 13 December 1877, Dufaure proceeded to form a moderate Republican government. The period following the formation of the last Dufaure cabinet was marked by a significant purge of the prefectural corps. Between 13 December 1877, and 1 January 1878, 85 prefects, 78 prefectural secretaries-general, and 280 sub-prefects were dismissed by Émile de Marcère. These high-ranking officials, who had served during the Moral Order, were considered to have espoused a conservative ideology by the new government. The number of prefects remaining in office across metropolitan France was reduced to two, representing a "prefectural massacre" that stands unparalleled except by the Republican purges of 1848 and 1870. Subsequently, the public prosecutor's office and the justice of the peace were affected by individual measures, resulting in the dismissal of five attorneys general, the transfer of two, the dismissal of 177 justices of the peace, and the relocation of 168. These actions were taken to rid the administration of officials who were most compromised with the former majority.

Following the 1879 senatorial elections, which resulted in a shift towards the left in the Senate, the Republican Party's control was further consolidated. With the full legislative power at their disposal, they initiated a campaign of civil service purges to ensure the loyalty of the state apparatus to the newly adopted political orientations. This purge, which had been in the planning stages for some time, was based in part on reports that had been collected before 16 May by Republican committees in collaboration with Freemasonry networks. These reports identified some high-ranking officials and military personnel who were deemed suitable for removal from their posts, thereby foreshadowing other instances of collusion between Republicans and Freemasons, such as the "Affair of the Cards" at the beginning of the 20th century.

== Developments ==
=== Turning point of January 1879 ===
==== Pressures from the Chamber of Deputies ====
Government Declaration of 16 January 1879:

"Another aspect of our internal life rightly concerns you, gentlemen. You ask us whether the numerous civil servants who make up the French administration are equally devoted to our new institutions. They may have hesitated about their duty in the early years following the war. But since the Republic became the constitutional government of France when two elections to the Chamber of Deputies and the last Senate elections gave this new regime a great and solemn consecration, can there still be any doubt? While a private citizen may use the broad freedom of speech and writing that the law allows against our institutions, can a civil servant do the same? Is not the use of a right by the former a kind of betrayal by the latter?

These principles of social morality are indisputable. However, in applying them, it is essential to consider the residual effects of the electoral struggles of 1877, as well as the prevailing sentiments of justice and respect for public service. It is imperative to maintain a zero-tolerance approach towards civil servants who, even outside the scope of their duties, engage in attacks and denigration of the very government they are entrusted to serve.

In short, we will not keep in office the declared adversaries of the Republic. But while being severe, we strive to be just, and we first want to be sure of the fault before imposing the penalty."

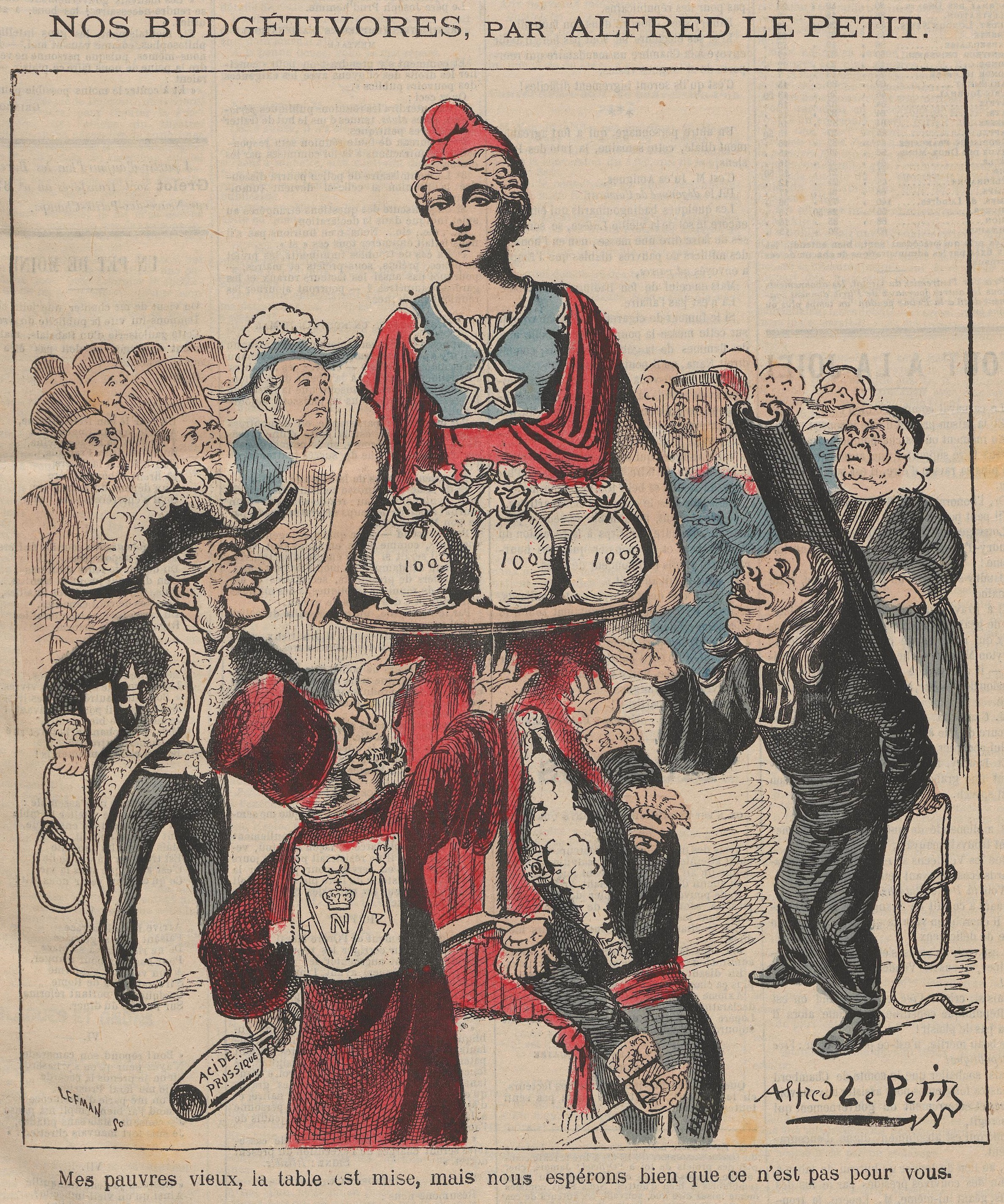
Grelot cartoon denouncing the monarchist views of the judiciary, army and clergy. The Republic, depicted in the guise of Marianne, is about to withdraw their salaries as civil servants.

Following the January 1879 French Senate election, which resulted in a Republican majority in the Senate, demands for a purge of the civil service once again gained momentum. On 16 January, the government was compelled to address the matter in its ministerial declaration. The declaration asserted that it was untenable for the civil service to oppose Republican institutions but clarified that dismissals would only affect those who were (or would be) guilty of deficiencies in the performance of their duties.

Although Jules Dufaure's interpretation of the declaration was deemed satisfactory by the Senate, Émile de Marcère could not assuage the demands of the Chamber of Deputies, which was in a state of upheaval. While the Center left (Note: This parliamentary group unites conservative Republicans under the guidance of Adolphe Thiers and subsequently Jules Dufaure.) supported the government, the radicals of the Republican Union found the government's conciliatory approach "unacceptable." Ultimately, the members of the Republican Left group demanded the issuance of a new declaration with more detailed information, thereby enabling them to Motion of Confidence in the government.

In this context of unrest, leftist deputy Jules Sénard challenged the government, denouncing the public ministry's superficial fidelity to the principles of the Republic. He concluded his remarks with the following statement: "The speaker would be pleased to see the ministry remain in office by declaring that it would associate itself through actions with the majority's desire to see only those civil servants willing to serve the Republic kept in office." Jules Dufaure delivered a response speech—judged by the deputies to be skillful—wherein he refuted the radicals' attacks while declaring himself ready to be more severe when the time was right.

Is it true, as the honorable Mr. Sénard said, is it true that we have been too respectful of services rendered, accepting as credentials even services that had been rendered to governments entirely opposed, by their opinions and tendencies, to the one now in power? No, gentlemen, that is not entirely accurate […]

[Dufaure details here the dismissals in the judiciary that he has carried out since taking office]

I will be more severe in the future... I will be severe; and yet, allow me to say, that it is not an empty word that was spoken in our program when we said we wanted to be just at the same time. […]

"Is it true, as the honorable Mr. Sénard said, is it true that we have been too respectful of services rendered, accepting as credentials even services that had been rendered to governments entirely opposed, by their opinions and tendencies, to the one now in power? No, gentlemen, that is not entirely accurate […]

[Dufaure details here the dismissals in the judiciary that he has carried out since taking office]

I will be more severe in the future... I will be severe; and yet, allow me to say, that it is not an empty word that was spoken in our program when we said we wanted to be just at the same time. […]

Having reassured the Republican Left of his intentions, the Prime Minister's proposal was adopted by the Chamber by a vote of 223 to 121. The motion, proposed by Jules Ferry, declared: "The Chamber of Deputies, relying on the government's assertions and persuaded that the Cabinet, now unencumbered by constraints, will not hesitate, following the significant national event of January 5, to provide the Republican majority with the justifications it has long sought on behalf of the country, particularly concerning the administrative and judicial personnel, proceeds to the subsequent item on the agenda," a text that effectively constitutes a vote of confidence.

==== Resignation of Mac Mahon ====
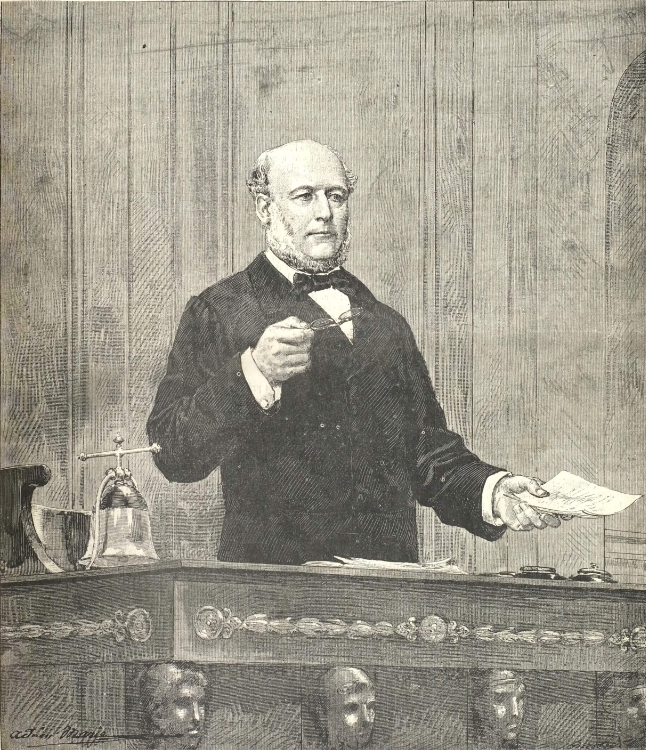
Jules Grévy reading Marshal de Mac Mahon's letter of resignation from the Chamber of Deputies, 30 January 1879.

In response to mounting pressure from the lower chamber, Jules Dufaure's government initiated the formulation of new measures aimed at further political cleansing. Despite his opposition to these measures, Patrice de Mac Mahon ultimately yielded to the determination of the ministers. The tipping point came when the Council of Ministers resolved to take action against French generals. This purge, requested by Minister of War Henri Gresley, targeted military leaders identified as hostile to the Republic in files compiled by Léon Gambetta between 1876 and 1878 with the assistance of Freemason networks. On 28 January 1879, the Marshal unequivocally declined to endorse these dismissals, stating, "Dismiss magistrates, prefects, and officials." If that is your decision, then so be it. However, I must object to the dismissal of generals. I would rather relinquish my position than acquiesce to these actions. My continued tenure after 14 December 1877, was solely to safeguard the integrity of the military. "To abandon it today would be to dishonor myself." The five generals whose dismissal was ordered were army corps commanders Charles Denis Bourbaki, Henri Jules Bataille, François Charles du Barail, Marie-Hippolyte de Lartigue, and Jean-Baptiste Montaudon. In addition, five other general officers were reassigned to remove them from their responsibilities. (Note: François Roth offers an alternative enumeration: he posits that Bourbaki, Bataille, and Lartigue are no longer active, whereas Aumale, Barail, Deligny, Douai, and Montaudon are currently on leave.) Subsequently, in the aftermath of the purported military conspiracy of 1877, the government dismissed three generals, including the legitimist Auguste Alexandre Ducrot.

In the face of the government's refusal to concede, the President of the Republic submitted his resignation in a letter to the presidents of the Chamber and the Senate on 30 January 1879. On the same day, Jules Grévy, the President of the lower chamber, was elected President of the Republic. With the change in the head of state, the Republicans gained control of the legislative and executive branches. In acknowledgment of Mac Mahon's departure and disillusionment with the political process, Jules Dufaure resigned, and Jules Grévy called upon William Waddington, another prominent figure of the Center left, to succeed him. Many ministers from the Republican Left, the parliamentary group from which the new president had emerged, were appointed to the Waddington cabinet. The moderate Republicans were now sufficiently established in power to launch a comprehensive purge. Jules Grévy even presented it as one of the government's primary objectives, stating, "While duly considering acquired rights and services rendered, now that the two great powers are animated by the same spirit, that of France, it will ensure that the Republic is served by officials who are neither its enemies nor its detractors."

==== Renewal of State bodies ====
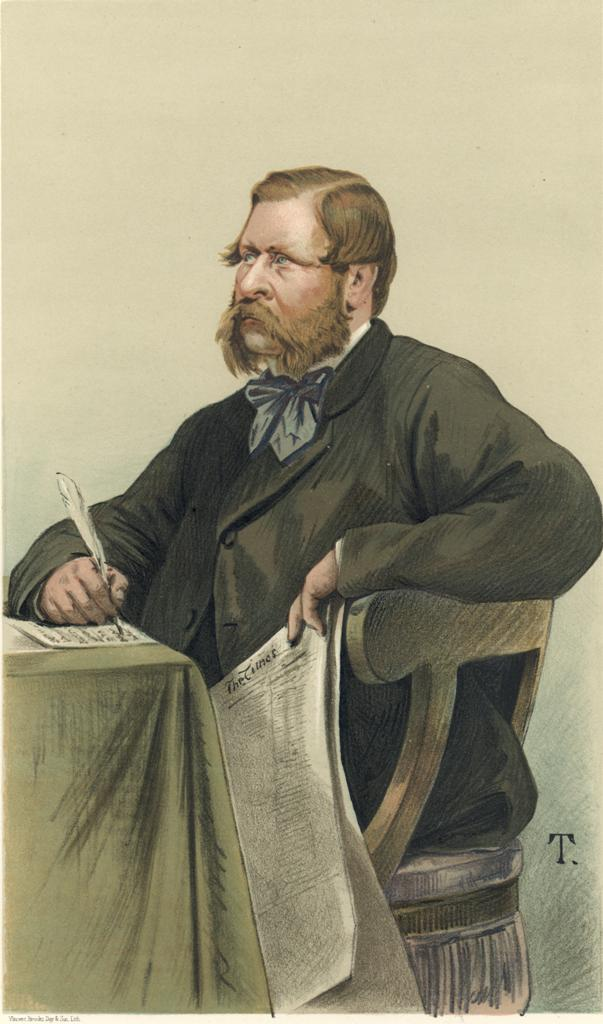
Drawing of William Henry Waddington published in Vanity Fair on 28 September 1878.

The government of William Waddington promptly initiated action. The Attorney generals of the Court of cassation and those of the Court of Appeal of Paris, Aix-en-Provence, Amiens, Agen, Angers, Bastia, Bordeaux, Bourges, Besançon, Caen, Chambéry, Dijon, Lyon, Nîmes, Poitiers, Rennes, Rouen, and Toulouse were dismissed. The majority of those dismissed were Catholics who were aligned with clericalism. These were not the only alterations to the Public Prosecutor's Office; numerous public prosecutors were also reassigned. In total, from 9 February 1879, to 31 December 1882, (Note: This period encompasses the purge initiated by the Waddington government and continued by the first Freycinet government. Additionally, the tally incorporates the resignations that followed the anti-religious decrees of 1880 (for further details, refer to the section on the purge of the judiciary).) Georges Picot documented 198 replacements or relocations out of 263 public prosecutors in the courts and 1,565 replacements or relocations out of 1,886 public prosecutors in the tribunals. While this purge was without precedent in its scale, it was not a novel phenomenon in principle. Similarly, the standing judiciary was also affected by the July Revolution of 1830. In total, 74 attorneys general and 254 prosecutors and substitutes were dismissed. In the aftermath of the French Revolution of 1848, 27 out of 28 attorneys general were replaced. In the case of Napoleon III, despite his general alignment with the prosecutor's office, he proceeded to dismiss two-thirds of the Attorney Generals appointed in 1848. Finally, the precedent of the Government of National Defense, which dismissed all Attorney Generals in September 1870, is worthy of note. The notable exception to this dismissal was the five prosecutors serving in cities threatened by the Prussians. The sitting judiciary was not exempt from the actions of the Waddington cabinet. During the same period, 237 replacements or relocations were made out of 739 irremovable magistrates of the courts and 745 out of 1,742 irremovable magistrates of the tribunals. Concerning the justices of the peace, they were not irremovable and thus particularly susceptible to government machinations. Of the original 2,941, 2,536 were replaced or relocated.

The dismissal of numerous ministry directors contributed to the ascendance of heads of offices within central administrations, who were less frequently replaced. The financial administration was also affected, with three treasurers-general dismissed, four placed on standby, and four retired. At the lower level of specific revenue offices, twenty officials were subject to such measures. This purge, which the Republicans had not previously considered feasible in 1848 and 1870, reflects the new majority's confidence in its forces. Most diplomatic posts changed their holders, yet the old conservative nobility retained its access due to the necessity of representation and prestige abroad. Prefects once again faced this change at the head of state, with thirty new transfers. Finally, the army, which Mac Mahon sought to protect, did not escape the purge, undergoing significant personnel changes in its top command.

However, not all government-dependent bodies were affected similarly. Despite facing significant criticism from radical factions, the Paris Police Prefecture underwent a relatively limited purge due to the pragmatic approach of Republican leaders. This institution had been on the brink of abolition under the National Defense government. Its role in the repression of republicanism had earned it the enmity of the new government, but its utility in countering the Paris Commune had secured its survival until the establishment of the Moral Order. The situation once again reached a critical juncture in January 1879. Yves Guyot published a series of scathing critiques of the police prefecture and its moral service in La Lanterne. However, his articles resulted in a lawsuit filed against him by Émile de Marcère, Minister of the Interior. Ultimately, the latter prevailed in the legal proceedings. Nevertheless, the proceedings revealed irregularities in the management of the police prefecture. On 3 March 1879, Georges Clemenceau questioned the government in the Chamber, reproaching the Minister of the Interior for failing to purge the officials who were in place during the crisis of 16 May 1877. This incident resulted in Émile de Marcère's resignation. However, the government, cognizant of the necessity for a zealous and experienced political police force, chose to retire the most scandal-tainted service chiefs and effectively settle the matter.

==== Religious matters ====
The Republican Party's desire to renew personnel also extended to the French episcopate. In accordance with the Concordat, the Republican government excluded clerics who were opposed to the regime from episcopal appointments. However, it generally reached an agreement with the Holy See, which had a say in the matter, to exclude candidates deemed to lack the requisite religious qualities. This included individuals proposed by radical parliamentarians. From 1879 to 1883, two-thirds of the 21 bishops appointed were favorable to the Republic. These were preferentially sent by the government to ultramontane dioceses, with the Republicans hoping to muzzle Catholics in this way. Consequently, Mgr Guilbert was successively appointed to the sees of Amiens and Bordeaux, Mgr Bellot des Minières replaced Cardinal Pie in Poitiers, and Mgr Meignan was placed in Arras and later Tours. Mgr Lamazouwas also among the ranks of the clerics appointed by the Republican government. However, this strategy was not always effective. The government was convinced that it had appointed a liberal prelate in Alfred Duquesnay, but he subsequently became one of the regime's most vocal opponents. Additional tensions emerged during the Saint-Claude affair at the end of 1879. The initial Freycinet government demanded the resignation of the legitimist bishop Louis-Anne Nogret, whose closest collaborator, Abbé Gréa, spearheaded the local clergy's active resistance to the government. Even though the Concordat regime did not permit the dismissal of a bishop who was already in office, the government exerted pressure on bishops who had been previously appointed with the approval of the Holy See. This resulted in the appointment of César-Joseph Marpot, who was known for his liberal views.

Ultimately, the Supreme Council of Public Instruction was also dissolved by the law of 27 February 1880, concerning the Supreme Council of Public Instruction and academic councils, promoted by Jules Ferry. This law excluded representatives of the Catholic Church from the aforementioned council.

=== Purge of the Council of State (July 1879) ===
==== Organization of the Council since 1872 ====
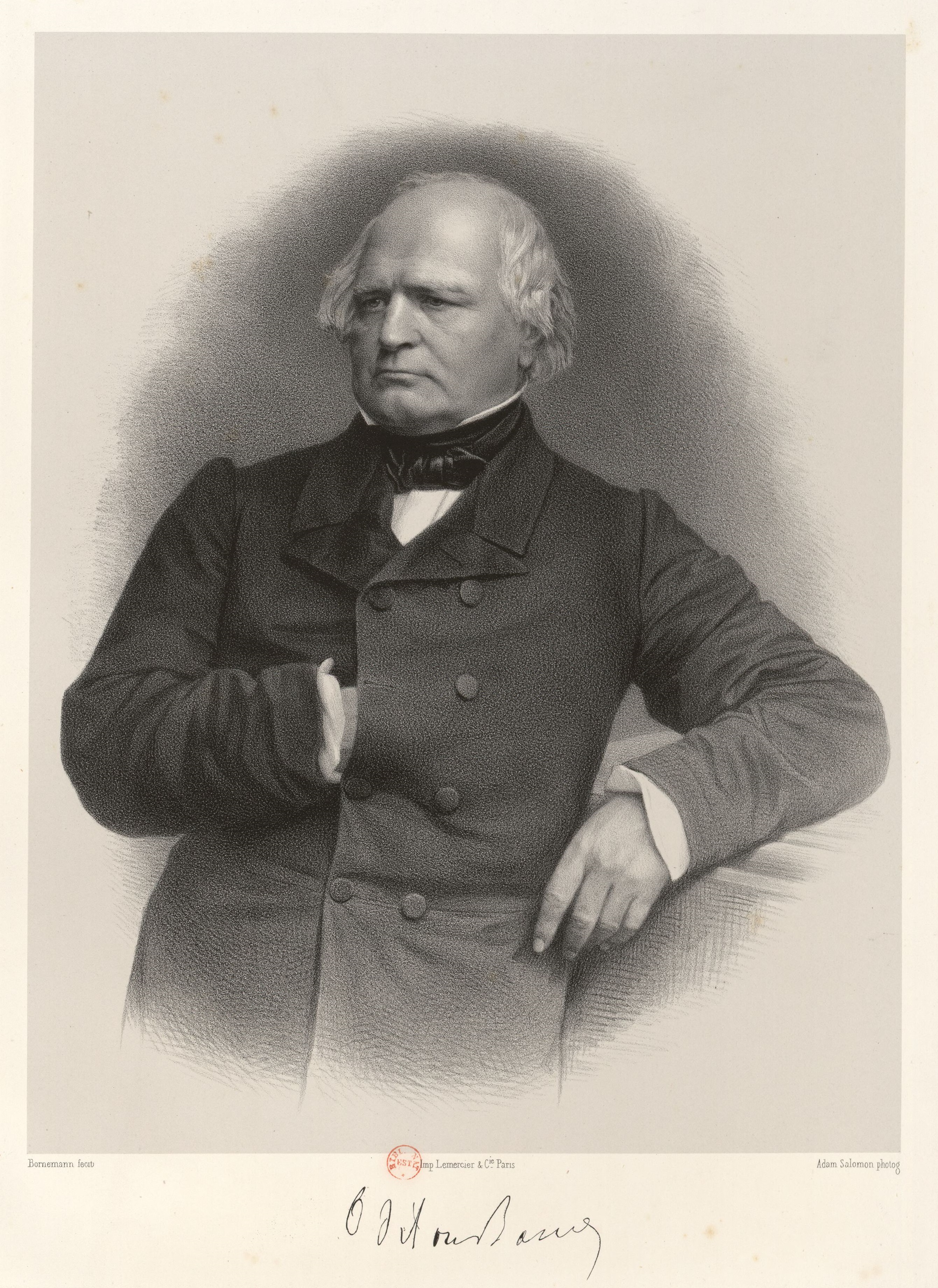
Odilon Barrot, Vice-President of the Council of State from 27 July 1872 until his death on 6 August 1873. Since an 1872 law, the presidency of the upper house has traditionally been vested in the Minister of Justice.

At the fall of the Second Empire, the Council of State narrowly avoided abolition. On 4 September 1870, Léon Gambetta and Jules Simon proposed the creation of an administrative tribunal for the National Defense government. This proposal was made although the liberal faction had long been suspicious of the efficacy of administrative justice. However, the moderates, led by Adolphe Crémieux, could retain a temporary commission that inherited the powers of the proposed tribunal. In June 1871, Jules Dufaure presented a government bill to provide provisional organization to the Council, pending agreement among parliamentarians on a constitution. The National Assembly then undertook the project, exceeding the government's expectations by definitively reorganizing the Council of State with the law of 24 May 1872. This law stipulated that:

- delegated justice is administered by the Council;
- the 22 ordinary service councilors 'are elected by the National Assembly, in a public session, by list voting, and by an absolute majority' (paragraph 3) and 'are renewed by a third every three years; the outgoing members are designated by drawing lots and are indefinitely re-eligible' (last paragraph);
- the 24 masters of requests are appointed by government decree;
- the vice-president of the Council and the section presidents are chosen by the government from among the elected councilors.

The appointment of ordinary service State Councillors by the deputies addresses the concerns of monarchists who seek to remove the Council from the authority of the Jules Dufaure government and the head of state, Adolphe Thiers. This has resulted in significant discontent among the republican minority. Nevertheless, the royalists conceded to reduce the number of ordinary service councilors from 28 to 22, thereby increasing the power of the extraordinary service State Councillors, who are appointed by the government. The 1872 elections for State Councillors confirmed the fears of those on the left of the political spectrum. The conservatives succeed in placing their candidates within the Council, with only three Republicans being elected. Thiers selects one of his close associates, Odilon Barrot, to assume the role of vice-president of the Council. Concerning the masters of requests and auditors, they are predominantly legal technicians, presumed to be apolitical.

In the view of Jean-Pierre Machelon, despite the pronounced politicization inherent to the selection of councilors, the Council of State evinces a commitment to impartiality in its adjudication of cases. In the period preceding the initial one-third renewal, the constitutional law of 28 February 1875, modified the appointment procedures, vesting this authority in the president of the Council. Monarchists seek to preclude the appointment of radical jurists to the Council, while Republicans acquiesce, perceiving the potential benefit of this renewal method for their future purge. However, the 1875 law stipulates that the councilors elected in 1872 can only be dismissed by a resolution of the Senate.

When Jules Dufaure initiated the second renewal in July 1878, he demonstrated a disregard for political considerations. This was evidenced by his decision to disregard the recommendations of those advocating for the purge and to reward technical expertise by retaining five of the seven councilors drawn by lot, promoting a monarchist master of requests, and replacing one military officer with another. However, the ascendance of the Republicans to power resulted in the inception of "permanent political discrimination" within the Council. Practicing Catholics and conservatives were conspicuously excluded from promotions and received no honors, in contrast to their Republican colleagues.

==== Suspicions of clericalism (1874–1879) ====
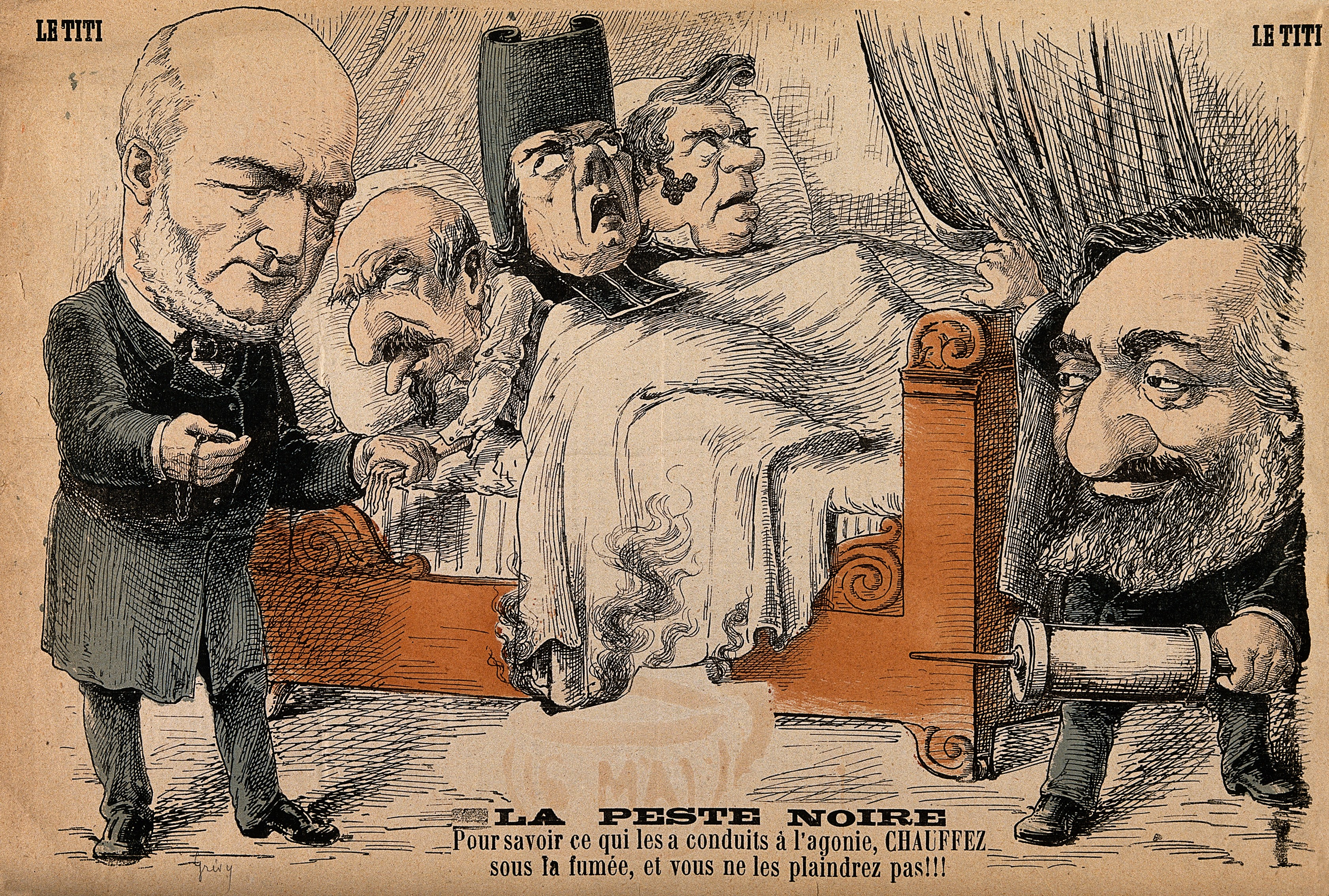
Cartoon published in Le Titi on 2 January 1879. Jules Grévy takes the pulse of Bonapartism, bedridden alongside clericalism and Orleanism, all three in agony after the 16 May crisis, symbolized by the contents of a chamber pot. Léon Gambetta holds a clyster, a purging instrument.

The Council's jurisdiction notably encompasses religious matters, which will be the focus of the Republicans' criticisms. The republicans view the Council, elected by a majority in 1872 by an assembly dominated by conservatives, as an instrument in the hands of the Catholic Church and a bastion of reaction. During this period, three major cases will crystallize this resentment.

In March 1874, the Ministry of Worship referred the question of the legal personality of dioceses, that is, their ability to own and receive property, to the Council. The rapporteur, Charles Franquet de Franqueville, a devout Catholic, presented his findings before the Interior Section and subsequently before the General Assembly of the Council. The latter body voted 13 to 9 in favor of recognizing the legal personality of dioceses, a decision that incensed the anti-clerical Republicans.

On 15 May 1879, the Council of State censured Archbishop of Aix-en-Provence, Théodore-Augustin Forcade, for his pastoral letter of 13 April 1879. Édouard Laferrière, Director of Worship, had initiated an appeal for abuse due to the prelate's criticisms of Jules Ferry's legislative proposals. This submission of the Council of State to the government's views did not enhance its reputation in the eyes of the republican press. The sympathies expressed by the State Councillors towards the archbishop and the Council's reluctance to render this decision were made public, further fueling the left's hostility.

In 1879, the issue of congregational schools once again came to the fore in the news. In 1878, several cases concerning primary education arose. In certain municipalities, the authorities decided to secularize schools that were run by Congregationalists. Those with religious affiliations contested the legality of the prefectural orders, taking the matter to the courts to have the abuse of power recognized and to obtain reinstatement in communal schools. The Conflict Tribunal, which had been convened by the prefects, ruled that these matters fell under the purview of administrative jurisdiction. Consequently, on 21 May 1878, the Congregationalists appealed to the Council of State. In November 1878, Jules Dufaure stated that the litigation section would issue a ruling as soon as the case was ready, with all other business ceasing. On 4 January 1879, the litigation section was ordered to issue a ruling. Baron Camille de Baulny, a master of requests, serves as the rapporteur for the case. He offers a scathing critique of the actions of the prefects during the preparatory phase. The Catholics, buoyed by this assessment, anticipate a favorable ruling from the Council of State.

These elements collectively contributed to the incendiary press campaign of 1879 against the Council of State. The campaign was spearheaded by some publications, including Le Réveil, which denounced the Council as "entirely devoted to clericalism," La Révolution française, which proclaimed, "It goes without saying that it is the clergy who guide the State Councillors!," La Lanterne, and Le Rappel.

==== Law of 13 July 1879 ====
The withdrawal of Dufaure and the arrival of Jules Ferry at the Ministry of Public Instruction resulted in a shift in the political landscape. Ferry adopted a strategy of obstructionism to prevent the Council from exerting its authority. He anticipates that his procrastination will persist long enough to complete the purge of this body before the decision is made. Ferry's strategy elicits protests from Catholics, particularly Senator Charles Chesnelong, who questions the government on this matter. In protest, four State Councillors known for their conservatism—including Vice President Paul Andral—resigned in February 1879.

In a move that has been met with concern by the Catholic community, Minister of Justice Philippe Le Royer has stated in the Senate that the issue of communal schools is of sufficient importance to justify the dismissal of the Council's most conservative members. As President of the Council of State and Minister of Justice, Le Royer even rebuffed the Council's reception held in his honor, thereby reassuring the republican majority of his unwavering resolve. On 18 March 1879, the government presented a bill to the Senate to reorganize the Council. The bill proposes, in particular, an increase in the number of ordinary service councilors from 22 to 32, thereby allowing the government to appoint ten Republicans who are aligned with the parliamentary majority. Additionally, the number of members in the remaining categories of the Council, namely masters of requests and first and second-category auditors, is to be increased. While the Senate is reluctant to align with the government's position, the Chamber of Deputies resists and, on the advice of its commission, demands the outright dissolution of the Council of State to appoint an entirely regenerated staff where Republicans could hold a majority in each section. To provide reassurance, the Minister of Justice makes the following declaration: "It is beyond question that the government's actions will be guided by this principle." The Council of State is a state institution; it must be in complete communion of ideas with the republican government," he states. He asserts that he is prepared to resort to dismissals to complete the purge, yet this does not succeed in moderating the intransigence of the tribunes Henri Brisson, Franck Chauveau, and André Duclaud. Ultimately, the deputy of the Extreme Left, Jules Senard, catalyzed the government to reassess the urgency of the purge. This was particularly relevant given the imminent examination by the Council of the issue of communal schools, scheduled for 18 July. Consequently, the government was able to rally the Chamber on 12 July.

On 14 and 15 July 1879, the Waddington cabinet issued decrees to appoint 10 State Councillors, 5 masters of requests, and two first-class auditors to newly created positions; retire seven councilors; dismiss two councilors and six masters of requests—including Baron de Baulny, the rapporteur of the communal schools’ case—and finally proceed with promotions. The twelve State Councillors who remain in office are three republican councilors (Auguste Gougeard, Abel Berger, and Albert Decrais), appointed in March 1879 to replace the resigning members; five conservatives still protected by the 1875 law (Emmanuel François Camus du Martroy, (Note: President of the Litigation Section.) The affected State Councillors are as follows: Auguste Silvy, Auguste Henri Fernand de Montesquiou-Fézensac, Charles Tranchant, and Hippolyte Perret. Additionally, four councilors whose expertise is deemed indispensable—Léon Aucoc, (Note: President of the public works section.) Victor Groualle, (Note: President of the interior section.) Eugène Goussard, (Note: President of the finance section.) and General Louis Dieudonné Gaillard—are also affected.

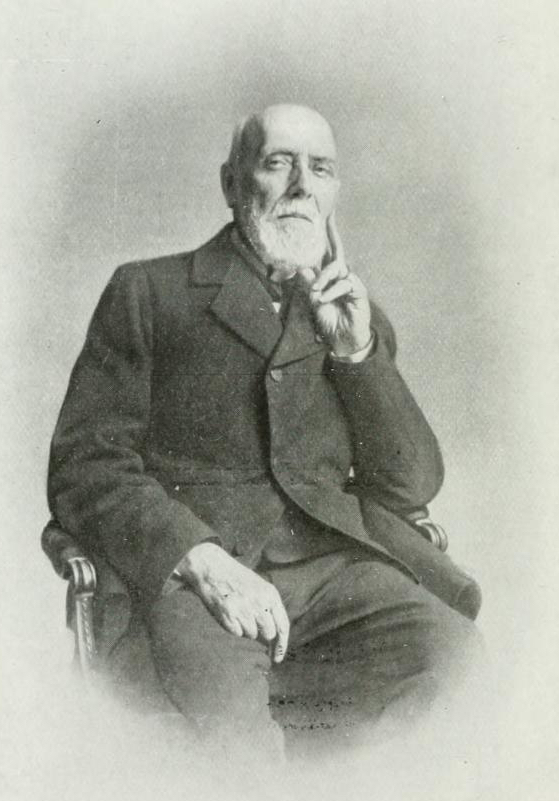
The Marquis Anatole de Ségur, State Councillor retired in July 1879 at the age of 56.

- Paul Andral, Vice President of the Council of State, Orleanist, and close to Patrice de MacMahon (resigned in February 1879);
- Frédéric d'Aymar, Marquis of Châteaurenard, monarchist candidate defeated in the 1877 legislative elections (resigned in February 1879);
- Philibert Lombard de Buffières, (Note: Son of Jean-Jacques-Louis Lombard de Buffières.) Count of Rambuteau, from an Orleanist family (resigned in February 1879);
- Léopold de Gaillard de Lavaldène, lawyer and former journalist at Le Correspondant (Note: Journal of liberal Catholicism and supporter of constitutional monarchy.) (resigned in February 1879);
- Henri Charles-Antoine Pascalis (retired in July 1879);
- Henri Le Trésor de La Rocque (retired in July 1879);
- Eugène Marbeau (retired in July 1879);
- Charles-Étienne Collignon, former Orleanist deputy (retired in July 1879);
- Anatole de Ségur (retired in July 1879);
- Marie René Edmond David (retired in July 1879);
- Louis Jules Lefebvre (retired in July 1879);
- Jean-Jacques Weiss (dismissed in July 1879);
- Jean Bernard Michel de Bellomayre (dismissed in July 1879).

The dismissal of the Council was met with considerable opposition from those on the political right. On 22 July, Senator Louis-Numa Baragnon questioned the government, noting that the collective dismissal of councilors was in violation of the law, as every dismissal must be individual and justified. Furthermore, he noted that David and Pascalis, who were permitted to exercise their right to retirement, were not yet eligible for any form of retirement benefits. The Senate, called to vote, approved the conduct of the Minister of Justice by a vote of 153 to 112. Notable figures from the Center left, including Léon Say, Jules Dufaure, Charles de Freycinet, and William Waddington, abstained from the vote. The Catholic press echoed L'Univers in its analysis, stating that the law was not a law on the Council of State, but rather a law against the religious congregations. Le Soleil further elaborated on this perspective, stating that:

It is neither for their experience nor their knowledge nor even for their origin that the councilors of State, so brutally expelled en masse like a stock of outdated goods thrown away, were dismissed. They were struck first because they could not be relied upon for their docility—better yet, for their servility in the case of appeals by the congregations.

Nevertheless, the government's primary disapproval originated from the Council itself. Subsequent to the issuance of the decrees, a number of State Councilors, including Aucoc, Camus du Martroy, Groualle, Goussard, Silvy, Montesquiou-Fézensac, Tranchant, and Perret, tendered their resignations in a public declaration. Furthermore, four Masters of Requests (including Franquet de Franqueville), one First Category Auditor, and four Second Category Auditors also resigned in protest. The majority of these individuals conveyed their resignation letters to the conservative press, which promptly disseminated them with the intention of discrediting the Republicans. Notably, Montesquiou-Fézensac articulated his stance in his resignation letter, stating: "I am unwilling to accept any degree of responsibility for an act that is without precedent in the history of the body to which I have been honored to belong." This mass defection and the government's difficulties in finding replacements resulted in the opposition press derisively characterizing the government's actions as ineffective. Nevertheless, by 25 July, all the resigning members had been replaced, and no conservative personalities remained among the State Councilors. The purge was completed with the decree of 14 August 1879, which prohibited graduates of free faculties from accessing the auditorate, definitively excluding Catholics from the institution.

=== Purge of the Judiciary (1883) ===
==== Historical background ====
The succession of regimes since the early nineteenth century had a regular and significant impact on the judiciary. To remove the most undesirable judges, monarchical regimes employed diverse strategies, including forced retirements, reorganizations of the judiciary, and oaths of loyalty, to discourage their most determined opponents. In a decree issued by the Senate on 12 October 1807, Napoleon I established a probationary period of five years for newly appointed judges before they could claim the constitutional security of tenure. This decree was followed by further measures taken on 24 March 1808, which resulted in the exclusion of nearly 162 judges on the grounds of professional incapacity and, on occasion, political hostility. The 1810 judicial reorganization, which involved the merger of the courts of appeal and the criminal courts into new entities designated as imperial courts, also permitted the implementation of discreet dismissals. During the Second Restoration, the Bourbons also targeted imperial judges between 1815 and 1821, who had switched sides during the Hundred Days, through a meticulous judicial reorganization. The quantitative extent of these evictions remains a topic of contention among historians, with estimates ranging from approximately 10 to 20% of the workforce. Following the coup d'état of 2 December 1851, the decree of 1 March 1852, established the retirement age for judges at 70 years of age (with an exception for the Court of cassation, where this limit was extended to 75 years). This measure facilitated the introduction of some renewal within the judiciary, with 132 sitting judges being retired as a result. Furthermore, the decree of 1 March required judges to "swear obedience to the constitution and loyalty to the president," with those who failed to comply facing dismissal.

However, it is notable that none of these regimes formally challenged the principle of immovability, a stance that was notably absent in the context of republican regimes. In consequence, the Second Republic, in its decree of 17 April 1848, pronounced the principle of immovability to be incompatible with the republican form of government (Note: The French Constitution of 4 November 1848, will address this principled opposition.) and proceeded to suspend fourteen sitting judges, including the president of the Lille tribunal and three counselors at the Court of cassation. In this regard, the proclamation of the Third Republic in 1871 was no exception. It resulted in reprisals against 15 immovable judges, who were accused of participating in judicial repression against opponents of the coup d'état of 2 December 1851, by participating in the mixed commissions of 1852. In 1879, the attorneys general, public ministry officials, and justices of the peace—who were not protected by the principle of immovability—were also subjected to scrutiny by the Waddington and Freycinet governments. These governments were relentless in their pursuit of any perceived or actual collusion with the Moral Order among these officials.

The dismissal of the sitting judiciary was yet to come; it would be unparalleled in comparison to those that preceded it during the nineteenth century and was, therefore, nicknamed the "purge of the century." According to André Damien, it was even "the most severe in the entire history of the French judiciary."

==== March 1880 decrees ====
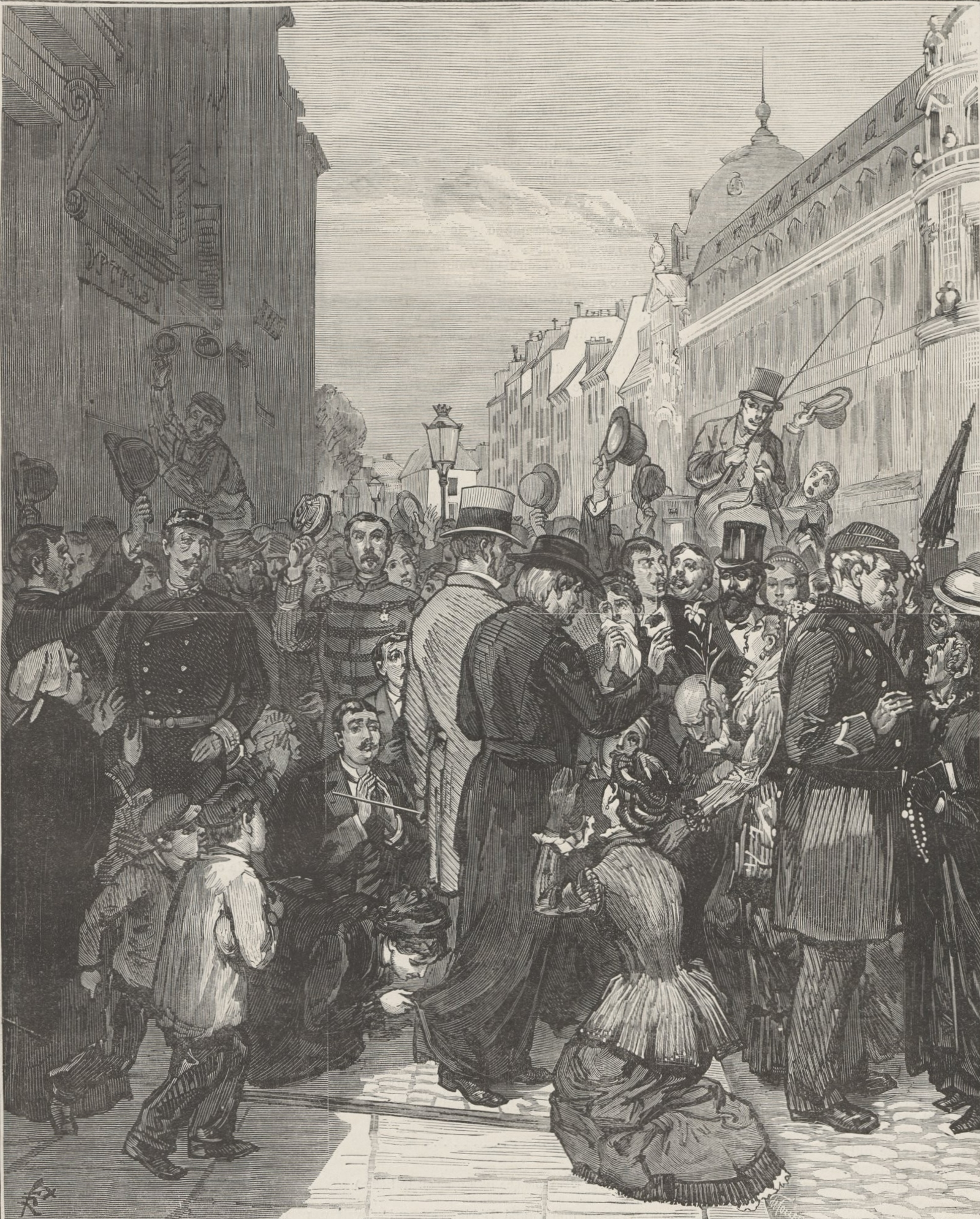
Expulsion of the Society of Jesus from their institution on rue de Sèvres, 30 June 1880 at 6 am. Drawing published in Le Monde illustré.

In March 1879, debates on the Jules Ferry law on higher education—subsequently known as the law of 18 March 1880—gave rise to considerable controversy due to its Article 7, which revoked the right of congregationist teachers to confer university degrees. The Republicans sought to inflict a decisive blow to Catholic education. The project was put to a vote by the Republican majority in the Chamber of Deputies on 19 July 1879. However, on 9 March 1880, the law was amended to remove Article 7 in the Senate, largely due to the efforts of Catholic senators, including Albert de Mun and Charles Chesnelong, who spearheaded a vigorous campaign in its defense.

In response to this rejection, Charles de Freycinet and Jules Ferry (Note: He did not sign the said decrees but was nonetheless their main inspirer, according to Tony Catta.) published two decrees in the Journal officiel on 29 March 1880. These decrees were issued under the government's regulatory authority and served to enforce Article 7 without the approval of parliamentarians. The initial decree stipulated the immediate expulsion of the Jesuits from France within three months, while the subsequent decree required all other male congregations to submit authorization requests or face the same consequences. The following day, the leaders of the primary congregations concurred to decline the submission of these requests in solidarity with the Society of Jesus. Charles de Freycinet then intimated a potential relaxation with the religious, yet the intransigence of his Interior Minister Ernest Constans compelled his resignation, and he was supplanted as President of the Council by Jules Ferry. The latter resolved to implement the decrees with considerable rigor, ordering the immediate expulsion of the recalcitrant congregations.

In anticipation of the judges' reluctance to comply, 600 of them were suspended on 24 March 1880, a few days before the decrees were published, for three years. The ministerial circular of 24 June 1880, assigned the responsibility of executing these expulsions to public prosecutors, which resulted in a significant number of resignations among prosecutors who opposed the anti-religious measures. Consequently, 556 judges declined to comply with the government's directives and opted to resign. The unrest was pervasive across all levels of the judiciary, both seated and standing. There were 56 resignations among members of courts of appeal, 63 among public prosecutors, 139 among deputies, 66 among justices of the peace, 188 among their deputies, 32 among judges, and so forth. By September 1880, the Douai Court of AppealCourt of Appeal of Douai had no remaining judges, as all had withdrawn. This movement of "self-purging," motivated by the "persecution" of Catholics, continued until June 1884 and ultimately resulted in 600 resignations.

This episode served to reinforce the Republican Party's perception of the judiciary as a crucial bastion of opposition, and as a domain where the tenets of caste and the animosity towards liberal ideologies are particularly prevalent. This realisation led to the conclusion that a swift and decisive takeover was imperative.

==== Republican judicial reform ====
===== Failed judicial reorganization projects =====
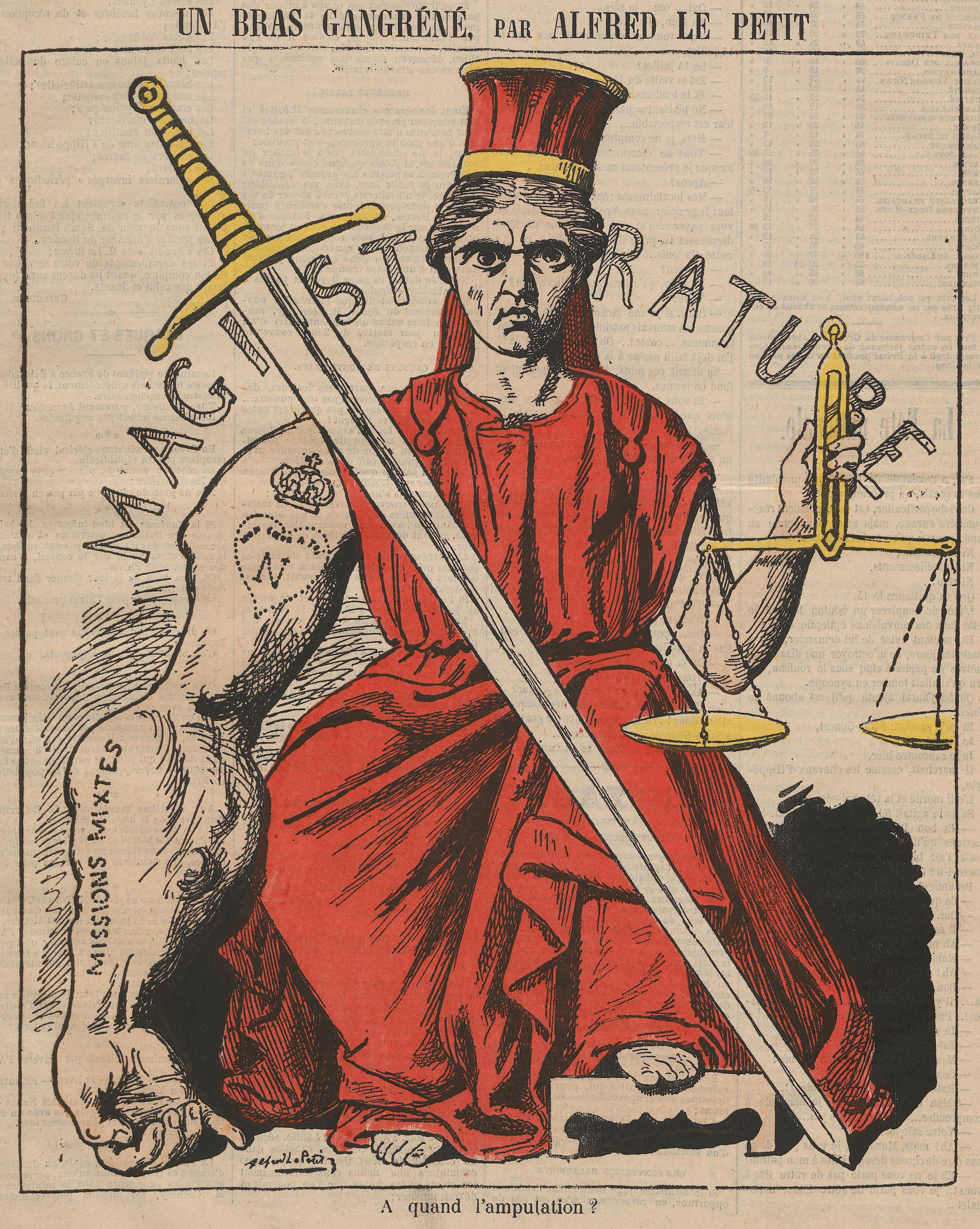
Cartoon in Le Grelot denouncing the Bonapartist sympathies of the judiciary, and its supposed tendency towards repression.

Since 1871, a number of bills pertaining to judicial reorganization have been submitted to the Chamber of Deputies and the Senate. Between 1879 and 1883, this concern intensified, with 22 legislative proposals being introduced. Legislative proposals on the subject were put forth by a number of prominent figures, including Boysset, Clemenceau, Floquet, and Madier de Montjau in March 1879, and Brisson, Boulard, and Mir in December 1879. These reform projects sought to address several key issues, including the inadequacy of judges' salaries, which were deemed insufficient to cover representation expenses, effectively reserved for judges from wealthy families. Additionally, the proposals aimed to revise appointment procedures and rethink the map of cantonal jurisdictions.

The parliamentary debates gradually shifted from an initial focus on judicial reform to a primary concern among the Republicans: the purge of the judiciary. While some Republicans sought to reduce the workforce and temporarily suspend the principle of immovability to achieve this goal, more radical members of the party were more ambitious and wanted to abolish the current judiciary and replace it with a new body elected from scratch. This would effectively be a return to the roots of the Republican programs of 1848 and 1871, as previously mentioned by Léon Gambetta in his Belleville program. Those with this view considered immovability to be a monarchical principle that obstructed national sovereignty, contrary to the prevailing legal doctrine. This doctrine, as expressed by Laboulaye and Sautel, regarded immovability as the optimal safeguard for judges and litigants against arbitrary power.

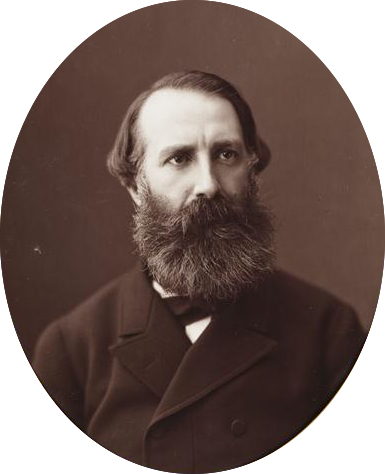
Georges Picot, republican jurist, author of several articles criticizing plans to purge the judiciary.

The most sophisticated reform proposal was the bill presented in January 1880 by Jules Cazot, Minister of Justice in the inaugural Freycinet cabinet. The proposal put forth a reduction in the number of chambers in both the first and second instances, a drastic reduction in the number of magistrates, and the renewal of the first presidents of courts of appeal and the presidents of tribunals every five years through government appointment. This effectively reversed the previously established immovability of these officials. This proposal prompted a wave of protests from numerous jurists, including the legitimist Adrien Robinet de Cléry, who was dismissed from his position as Attorney general at the Court of cassation by Cazot on 13 January 1880. The measure was perceived as a means of removing "meritorious, talented, and honorable" magistrates in favor of individuals who were "dried-up fruits of the Bar and the intrigants of the day, the complacent and the hypocrites," who had opportunistically supported the Republicans. Additionally, those with Republican affiliations voiced their apprehensions. In his article La Réforme judiciaire, (Note: Published in Revue des deux Mondes read on Wikisource.) Georges Picot denounced the project as one that aimed to "destroy root and branch men and institutions to create a new system with a wave of the wand," preferring instead limited individual measures and "a wise spirit of reform" that maintained immovability. Georges Martin-Sarzeaud, for his part, expressed concern about the potential for "arbitrary deviations, the regime of good pleasure, and despotism." However, it was not the criticisms from the legal world that prompted the Republicans to withdraw the project; rather, the bill fostered divisions between opportunists and radicals due to the proximity of the August 1881 elections. The Freycinet cabinet, having failed to resolve the issue of the March 1880 decrees, was succeeded by the Jules Ferry government, which prioritized legislation concerning education despite the objections of the parliamentary majority. During the parliamentary session that took place in the autumn of 1880, the government was compelled to tender its resignation to Jules Grévy, who declined to accept it. This was because the Chamber of Deputies was unwilling to postpone the discussion of the magistrature law. Ultimately, however, Léon Gambetta, who was the leader of the Union Républicaine, was prepared to enter into negotiations and, as a result, the bill did not reach the Senate.

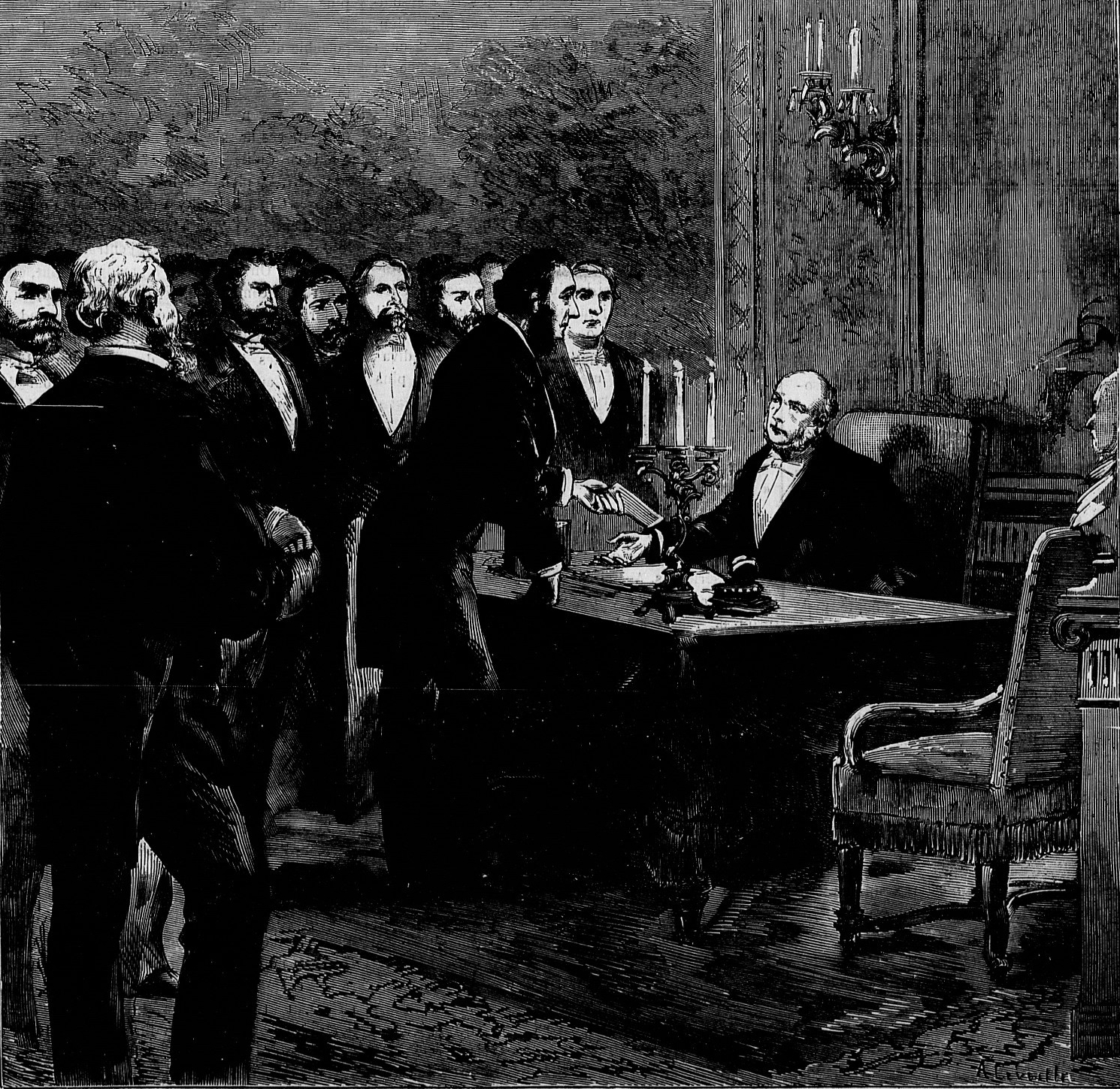
The Jules Ferry government hands in its resignation to Jules Grévy, in the latter's office at the Élysée Palace.

The 1881 elections resulted in a strengthening of the influence of the radicals, which enabled the Gambetta government to assume power. However, the government's authoritarianism quickly became a source of frustration for parliamentarians, leading to the downfall of the "Grand Ministry" at the end of January 1882. This was largely due to a vote to revise the 1875 Constitution without first implementing the much-anticipated magistrature reform. The new Freycinet government was less left-leaning and afforded the Republican Left a greater degree of autonomy. In early 1882, the Minister of Justice, Gustave Humbert, presented a revised bill on judicial organization, which proposed a provisional suspension of immovability and stipulated the abolition of select courts of appeal based on statistical evidence. As the parliamentary debates continued, there was a growing sense of unrest and agitation within the courts of appeal that were directly affected by the proposed measure. The cities of Angers, Bastia, Bourges, Chambéry, Limoges, Orléans, and Pau. The Court of Appeal in Angers, which was dominated by conservatives, was particularly turbulent. It engaged in disruptive behavior, including heckling the public prosecution and mobilizing local institutions—including the bar association, the city council, and the departmental council—to support its demands. The Chamber of Deputies further exacerbated tensions by voting on 10 June 1882, (Note: In May 1882, the parliamentary commission had already proposed the establishment of a body of itinerant magistrates, the creation of correctional courts, and the abolition of immovability.) against the government's wishes for the Douville-Maillefeu amendment, which abolished immovability and decided on the election of judges.

===== Drafting of the 30 August Law =====
Article 11 of the 30 August 1883 law:

Within three months of the promulgation of the law, the reduction of personnel in the Courts of Appeal and tribunals will be carried out according to the rules established above.

The eliminations will affect all personnel indiscriminately.

The number of magistrates dismissed, either because they were not retained in judicial functions or because they did not accept the new position offered to them, cannot exceed the number of abolished positions.

Magistrates who, after 2 December 1851, were members of mixed commissions will not be retained, regardless of their jurisdiction.

Despite the apparent resolution of the issue, a significant reversal occurred in January 1883. Some political figures, including radicals Pierre Waldeck-Rousseau and Jules Roche, reversed their position and opposed the establishment of elective magistrature. These figures were concerned about the independence granted by the election. They perceived a risk in creating a truly autonomous judicial power, which they regarded as a potential threat to the government, particularly in jurisdictions held by conservatives. In response to the evolving circumstances, the newly appointed Minister of Justice, Paul Devès, prepared a revised draft at the end of January 1883. This draft extensively revised the parliamentary committee's text, removing the elective principle. However, Devès, who was preoccupied with the collapse of the Fallières government, was unable to propose it for a vote. Consequently, the responsibility of implementing parliamentary reform was assigned to Félix Martin-Feuillée, Keeper of the Seals in the second Ferry cabinet. In March 1883, Martin-Feuillée presented three draft proposals to the Chamber. The first pertained to the judiciary itself and served as the foundation for the law enacted on 30 August 1883. The second addressed the role of peace judges, while the third focused on the establishment of correctional assizes.

Article 14 of the 30 August 1883 law:

The Superior Council of the Judiciary will exercise, concerning the first presidents, chamber presidents, counselors of the Court of cassation and Courts of Appeal, as well as the presidents, vice-presidents, judges, and substitute judges of the courts of first instance and peace, all disciplinary powers currently vested in the Court of Cassation as well as the courts and tribunals, by the provisions of Article 82 of the senatus-consulte of 16 Thermidor Year X, Chapter 7 of the law of 20 April 1810, and Articles 4 and 5 of the decree of 1 March 1852.

Political deliberations are prohibited for judicial bodies.

Any manifestation or demonstration of hostility towards the principle or form of the Republican government is prohibited for magistrates.

Violation of the above provisions constitutes a disciplinary offense.

The initial draft addressed the majority of parliamentary discussions, which commenced on 24 March. The subsequent two drafts were swiftly dismissed. The explanatory statement set forth the objective of establishing "complete harmony" between public authorities for the "regular" functioning of institutions. Radicals vigorously protested the removal of the elective principle, labeling the law a "governmental expedient" (a term used by Camille Pelletan). Some opportunist parliamentarians also expressed regret that the government had renounced modifying judicial boundaries and abolishing immovability for certain positions in favor of focusing on reducing personnel. When pressed to explain, Martin-Feuillée responded to the criticisms of the parliamentary majority by subtly admitting that the removal of conservative magistrates should take precedence over any other principle considerations. This strategy was successful, as evidenced by the votes in the Chamber on 4 June, the Senate on 31 July, and a final vote of the Chamber on 1 August 1883, which adopted the law with a large majority. Those on the right side of the political spectrum voiced their opposition, accusing the government of pursuing a political vendetta. This opposition was particularly evident when Mgr Freppel took the floor on 4 June to denounce the proposed changes as a "Saint Bartholomew's Day for magistrates." However, despite this opposition, the amendments were not adopted.

The 30 August 1883 law includes three main provisions for the functioning of justice:

- Articles 2 to 5 provide for a reduction in staff in the courts of first instance and the abolition of certain chambers of courts of appeal;
- Articles 3 to 7 decide on increasing magistrates' salaries and harmonizing classes between jurisdictions;
- Articles 13 to 17 establish the Superior Council of the Judiciary.

The purging of the judiciary is addressed in Articles 11 and 14. Article 11 of the law suspends the immovability of sitting magistrates for three months. Article 14 requires the judiciary to maintain collective neutrality, complementing the individual loyalty obligation imposed on judicial officers.

==== Suspension of the immovability of the Bench ====
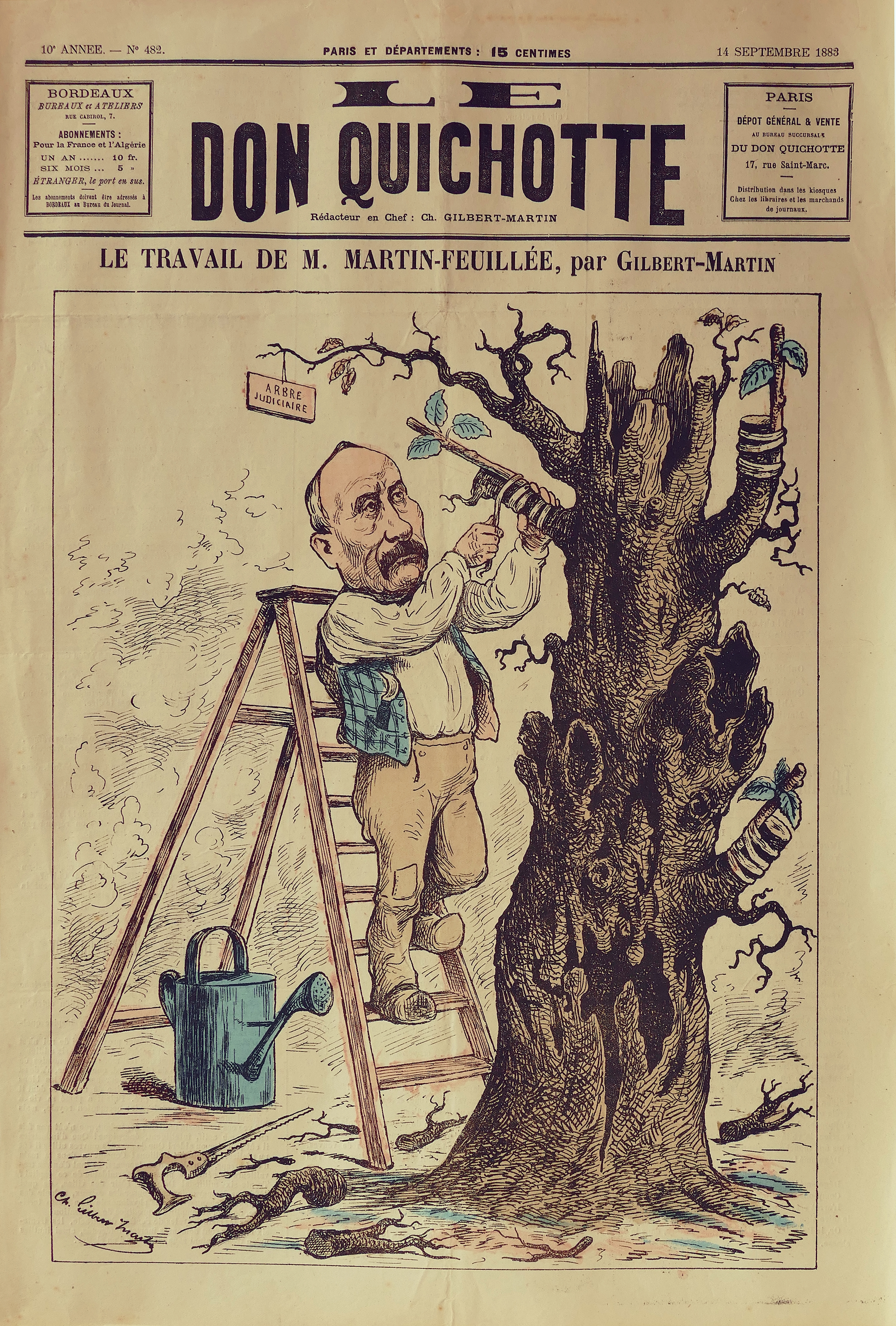
Cartoon in the Republican newspaper Le Don Quichotte depicting Minister of Justice Félix Martin-Feuillée pruning the "judicial tree".

The implementing decrees were published between 5 September and 13 November 1883, delineating the identities and roles of the dismissed magistrates. A total of 614 dismissals were recorded, which, when considered alongside the resignations prompted by the 1880 decrees, illustrates the extent of this judicial purge. By combining the officials of the public ministry and the sitting judiciary, Martin-Feuillée effectively circumvented the provision of Article 11, which prohibited the dismissal of more officials than the number of abolished positions. By focusing dismissals solely on bench magistrates while simultaneously eliminating positions in the public ministry, he reassigned no fewer than 230 Republican public prosecutors to judgeships, excluding their previous holders. Those subjected to dismissal included ten individuals occupying the role of first president of the courts and 117 individuals serving as tribunal president. The dismissed magistrates in Paris and Lyon were as follows: one chamber president and eight counselors of the Paris Court of Appeal, one vice-president and seven judges at the Seine Tribunal, nine other tribunal presidents, and twenty-three other judges in the Paris jurisdiction; one chamber president and five counselors (out of 23) at the Court of Appeal of Lyon, the president, one vice-president, and three judges at the Lyon Tribunal, and ten other magistrates in the Lyon jurisdiction.

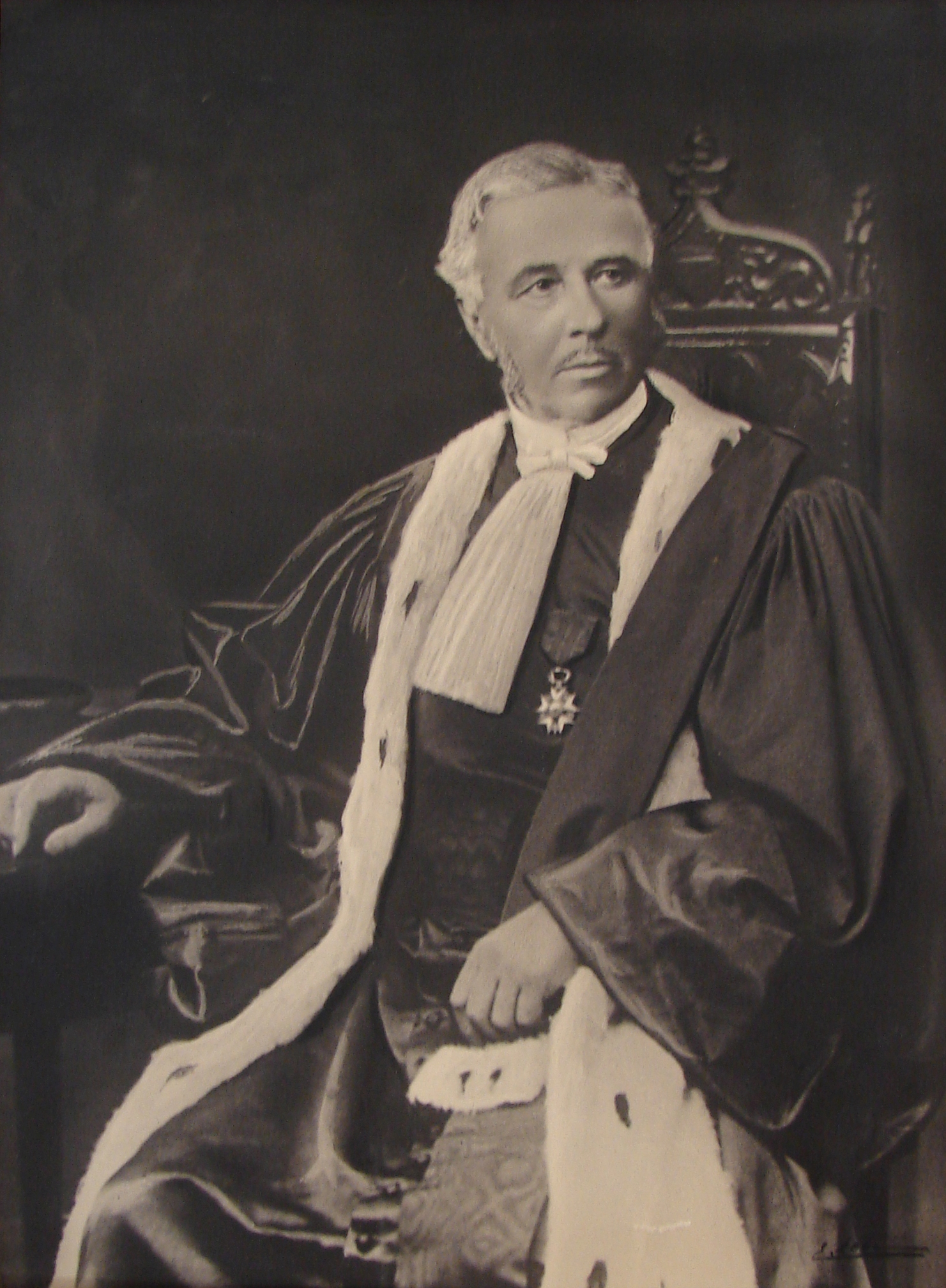
Charles Jac, first president of the Court of Appeal of Angers, dismissed in 1883.

In the remainder of France, the situation was more nuanced. The mean number of judges dismissed per department was seven; however, in the Nord department, which is the seat of the Court of Appeal of Douai, the number of dismissed bench magistrates reached fourteen. This figure includes the first president of the Court of Appeal, Jean-Paul Bardon, as well as six counselors of the Court of Appeal and the presidents of the three main tribunals. Lille (Félix Le Roy), Dunkirk, and Saint-Amand-les-Eaux. In the neighboring Pas-de-Calais region, which also falls within the jurisdiction of the Douai Court of Appeal, only two magistrates were dismissed, including the president of the Béthune tribunal. The department of Maine-et-Loire, a region historically characterized by conservatism and a strong Catholic presence, was particularly affected by the dismissals. It saw the removal of 29 judges, including the first president Charles Jac, (Note: One of the first victims of the purge due to his clashes with the public prosecutor.) the chamber presidents Coutret (Note: He is remembered by Republicans with disfavor for his role in the repression of socialists in 1851 as president of the Saint-Calais court, his participation in a mass in memory of the dead of Castelfidardo, and his friendly relations with Mgr. Freppel.) and Julien Bigot, (Note: Former deputy of Mayenne who sat with the conservatives.) and 14 other counselors of the Court of Appeal of Angers. Notably, two of the three chambers of the Court of Appeal were abolished as a result. Concurrently, only one-third of the members of the Rennes, Poitiers, and Douai Courts of Appeal were subject to the proscription enacted by the Jules Ferry government.

A review of the profiles of the dismissed magistrates reveals that the purge was driven by political and religious considerations, with a disregard for the professional competence of the purged judges. The individuals subjected to dismissal were typically of a high rank in the hierarchy and exhibited a pronounced inclination towards practicing Catholicism, with a minority displaying a proclivity towards clericalism. The political criteria for the purge were twofold: an attachment to the Second Empire and resistance to the 1880 decrees. Notably, several of the magistrates who were dismissed in 1883 had previously been removed from their posts in 1848 and 1870. The selection of these individuals also indicated an intention to weaken the financial and social influence of those in opposition and to target the economic interests of families and networks known for their conservative outlook. Notwithstanding these constants, the selection of magistrates to be removed appeared to be more influenced by a multitude of denunciations from local Republican actors—such as unscrupulous rivals, unsuccessful opponents of appointments, disgruntled litigants, and so forth—than by a comprehensive and coherent plan for evaluating judges. The conditions for forced retirement demonstrate the government's disdain. The introduction of a derogatory pension regime for magistrates in Article 12 resulted in the revocation of the normal pension for all dismissed judges who had entered office at a later point in time.

This "large-scale exclusion movement" was followed by a series of resignations from magistrates, which demonstrated their solidarity with the purged officials, protested against the government, or expressed their refusal to collaborate with the newcomers, whom they considered unworthy of holding these positions. These resignations were typically accompanied by letters published in the Catholic press.

== Consequences ==
=== Stronger regime foundation ===
It is notable that certain administrative bodies, particularly the judiciary, remained conservative environments throughout this period. The purge by the Republicans effectively prevented high-ranking officials in these bodies from opposing them. The regime's foundation was undeniably stabilized by this period of upheaval in the civil service, as evidenced by the achievement of the two initial objectives of the ruling majority: facilitating the defense of the new institutions and ensuring the rooting of the ruling ideology.

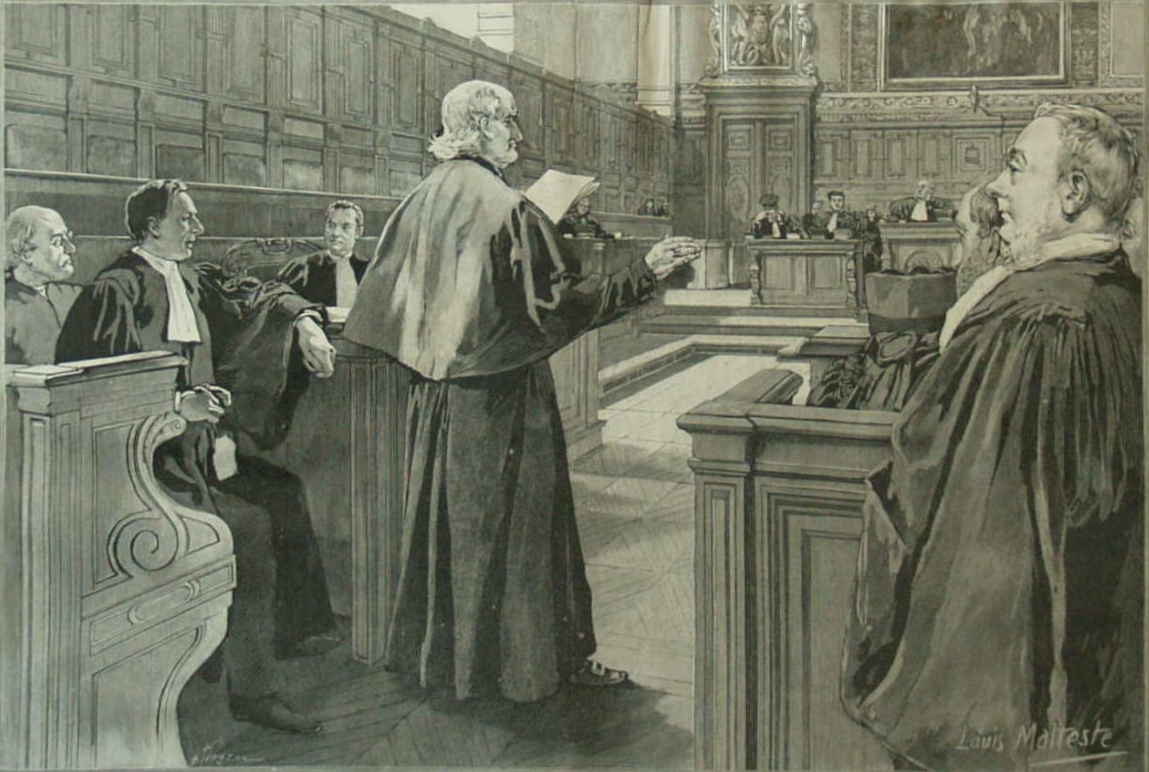
Xavier Gouthe-Soulardbefore the First Chamber of the Paris Court of Appeal, 1891; engraving published in L'Illustration.

The "purged" Council was notable for its pronounced republicanism and militant anticlericalism, including the inclusion of thirteen Freemason counselors. Similarly, the judiciary became increasingly compliant with the government starting in 1883, largely embracing the anticlericalism intrinsic to the Third Republic.

In the wake of the political upheaval that followed the purge, the civil service aligned with the government and joined the battle against the conservative opposition, particularly on matters of religion. By the end of 1879, the "purged" Council of State had ruled on matters about communal school affairs—which had been a significant factor in its purge by the Republicans—and had declared that the powers of prefects were "without restrictions" in this area. This stance was in stark contrast to the vote on the litigation section in early 1879. In 1883, during the initial phase of the First Textbook War, the administration spearheaded the government's response, with numerous reports from prefects of several thousand clerics who opposed Émile Flourens' directives. Additionally, the Council of State issued no fewer than 2,000 suspensions of pay for Catholic clergy. Similarly, on 2 June 1892, the Council of State issued a declaration of abuse in the Gouthe-Soulard case—on which the purged Paris Court of Appeal also had to rule in 1891—with considerably less reluctance than in May 1879. Ultimately, in the 1892 "electoral" catechism case, the Council did not hesitate to condemn Cardinal Place and Mgr. Catteau by adopting a restrictive interpretation of the area reserved for religion.

=== Strengthening of political opposition ===
Although the regime emerged from this power struggle with enhanced strength, it is clear that the ranks of conservative politicians were reinforced by the extensive purge of the civil service. With the cessation of their administrative duties and the lifting of their obligation to the reserve, some conservative figures could express their political and religious views with greater vigour. A considerable number of former magistrates, now engaged in the practice of law, became contributors to the Revue Catholique des Institutions et du Droit, which was marked by a counter-revolutionary and natural law legal doctrine. Notably, the jurist committees, such as that of Baron de Mackau, could also rely on their support. They provided counsel to bishops and congregations while spearheading legal challenges against secular legislation. In the 1885 legislative elections, a significant number of conservative candidates were former magistrates. Among the dismissed members of the Council of State, Jules Auffray applied his skills to La Défense Religieuse et Sociale (Note: Catholic journal founded by Félix Dupanloup.) and to the nationalist cause when elected deputy of the Seine in 1902. In the 1880s, he was also a lawyer for congregations, working alongside another former Council auditor, Louis Paul de Crousaz-Crétet. Anatole Lebas de Girangy-Claye published articles in Le Gaulois and Le Moniteur Universel that reflected monarchist influences. Additionally, Augustin-Fernand Caillard d'Aillières served as a deputy for Sarthe and aligned with the monarchist faction. The Société générale d'éducation et d'enseignement was significantly strengthened by the purge, which saw its ranks filled with dismissed magistrates and officials from the "Moral Order." Among its leaders were Lebas de Girangy-Claye (former auditor), who became its Secretary-General; Charles Franquet de Franqueville (former maître des requêtes), who was now able to dedicate himself fully to the organization; Paul Laurans (former prefect); and Jean Ernoul (former Minister of Justice).

In the long term, the Republican purges also increased the permeability of some circles to anti-republican ideologies. As a result, the legal world, which had been victim to the purges of 1879 and 1883, became, on average, more receptive to the theses of Action Française. The struggle against the republican regime subsequently united the magistrature and clergy, and in some instances, the magistrature with the clergy. As posited by Stéphane Boiron, jurists may have constituted a significant proportion of the cadres of Charles Maurras' movement, including Marie de Roux, a lawyer for the league, and Paul Robain, one of the founders of the newspaper L'Action française. In general, the purge appears to have reinforced the conservatism of the legal community. For example, Alexandre Zévaès posits that by 1933, 1,500 to 1,600 of the 2,000 lawyers in the Paris bar were aligned with the party of order.

== See also ==
- Épuration légale, the French purge of 1944–1951

== Bibliography ==
=== In English ===
- Anderson, Robert David. France 1870–1914: politics and society (Taylor & Francis, 2024).
- Martin, Benjamin F. "The Courts, the Magistrature, and Promotions in Third Republic France, 1871–1914." American Historical Review 87.4 (1982): 977–1009. online

=== General bibliography ===
- Berlière, Jean-Marc (1996). Le Monde des polices en France: XIXe-XXe siècles (in French). Vol. 2. Brussels: Complexe. ISBN 2-87027-641-9.
- Cabanel, Patrick (2000). "La République contre les catholiques ?". Serviteurs de l'État : une histoire politique de l'administration française (1875-1945) (in French). La Découverte. pp. 169–182. ISBN 2707155500.
- Halévy, Daniel (1937). La Fin des notables: La République des ducs (in French). Paris: Hachette.
- Machelon, Jean-Pierre (1976). La République contre les libertés ? Les restrictions aux libertés publiques de 1879 à 1914 (in French). Paris: Presses de la Fondation nationale des sciences politiques. ISBN 978-2-7246-0361-3.
- de Witt, Pierre (1887). L'Épuration sous Troisième République: d'après le Journal officiel et l'Almanach national (in French). Paris: Société anonyme de publications périodiques. Archived from the original on 21 August 2024.
- Wright, Vincent (1977). "Les épurations administratives de 1848 à 1895". Les Épurations administratives (XIXe – XXe siècles). Publications du Centre de recherches d'histoire et de philologie de la IVe section de l'École pratique des hautes études / Hautes études médiévales et modernes (in French). Geneva: Droz. pp. 69–80. ISBN 978-2-600-03379-4.

=== Religious matters ===
- Gadille, Jacques (1967). La pensée et l'action politiques des évêques français au début de la IIIe République (1870–1883) (in French). Hachette.
- Marchasson, Yves (1974). La Diplomatie romaine et la République française : à la recherche d'une conciliation (1879–1880) (in French). Paris: Beauchesne.
- Marchasson, Yves (1977). "Une nomination épiscopale sous Léon XIII : l'action du nonce Czacki dans l'affaire de Saint-Claude (octobre 1879 – mars 1880)". Revue d'histoire de l'Église de France (in French). 63 (170): 57–78. doi:10.3406/rhef.1977.1592. Archived from the original on 21 August 2024.

=== Cleansing the Council of State ===
- Machelon, Jean-Pierre (1998). "L'avènement de la Troisième République (1870–1879)". La Revue administrative (in French). 51: 19–25. JSTOR 40771060.
- Wright, Vincent (1972a). "L'affaire de l'archevêque d'Aix devant le Conseil d'État en 1879". Revue d'histoire de l'Église de France (in French). 58 (161): 259–289. doi:10.3406/rhef.1972.1777. Archived from the original on 21 August 2024.
- Wright, Vincent (1972b). "L'épuration du Conseil d'État en juillet 1879". Revue d'histoire moderne et contemporaine (in French). 19 (4): 621–653. doi:10.3406/rhmc.1972.2239. Archived from the original on 21 August 2024.

=== Army purge ===
- Bédarida, François (1964). "L'Armée et la République : les opinions politiques des officiers français en 1876–78". Revue historique (in French). 232 (1): 119–164. JSTOR 40949869. Archived from the original on 21 August 2024.
- Boniface, Xavier (2018). "Le loyalisme républicain de l'armée dans la crise du Seize-Mai 1877". Le Seize-mai revisité. Histoire et littérature du Septentrion (IRHiS) (in French). Villeneuve-d'Ascq: Publications de l’Institut de recherches historiques du Septentrion. pp. 79–93. ISBN 978-2-490296-14-9. Archived from the original on 15 July 2022.
- Roth, François (1999). "Mac Mahon, le maréchal président (24 mai 1873 - 30 janvier 1879)". Militaires en République (1870–1962) : Les officiers, le pouvoir et la vie publique en France (in French). Publications de la Sorbonne. pp. 111–122. ISBN 9782859443627.

=== Purge of the judiciary ===
- Bernaudeau, Vincent (2003). "La magistrature dans la balance au temps de la République combattante : l'affaire des décrets, prélude à la « révolution judiciaire » dans l'ouest de la France (1879–1880)". Histoire de la justice (in French) (15): 199–218.
- Bernaudeau, Vincent (2011). "L'Anjou, la République et ses juges : l'épuration du corps judiciaire, entre réaction de légitime défense et instrument de consolidation du régime (1883)". Criminocorpus (in French). doi:10.4000/criminocorpus.328. Archived from the original on 21 August 2024.
- Catta, Tony (1930). "Le cinquantenaire d'un coup de force : les décrets du 29 mars 1880 et l'épuration de la magistrature". Revue catholique des institutions et du droit (in French). 68: 385–414. Archived from the original on 29 June 2021.
- Clère, Jean-Jacques (2000). "Malheurs et malaises de la magistrature française au début de la IIIe République (1870–1914)". Le bonheur est une idée neuve: hommage à Jean Bart (in French). Dijon: Centre Georges Chevrier. pp. 65–110.
- Gaudemet, Yves-Henri (1970). Les Juristes et la Vie politique de la IIIe République (in French). Paris: Presses universitaires de France.
- Machelon, Jean-Pierre (1994). "L'épuration républicaine: La loi du 30 août 1883". L'Épuration de la magistrature de la Révolution à la Libération: 150 ans d'histoire judiciaire (in French). Paris: Éditions Loysel. ISBN 2-907679-22-8.
- Martinage, Renée (1986). "L'épuration des Magistrats du Nord en 1883". Revue du Nord (in French). 68 (270): 663–676. doi:10.3406/rnord.1986.4241. Archived from the original on 3 February 2023.
- Picot, Georges (1884). "Les magistrats et la démocratie: une épuration radicale". Revue des Deux Mondes (in French). 62: 288–315. Archived from the original on 21 August 2024.
- Tanguy, Jean-François (1990). "La plus grande épuration judiciaire de la France contemporaine". Répression et Prison politiques au XIXe siècle (in French). Paris: Éditions Créaphis. pp. 127–144.
