= French Third Restoration =

Attempt to restore the Kingdom of France in the 1870s

Third Restoration
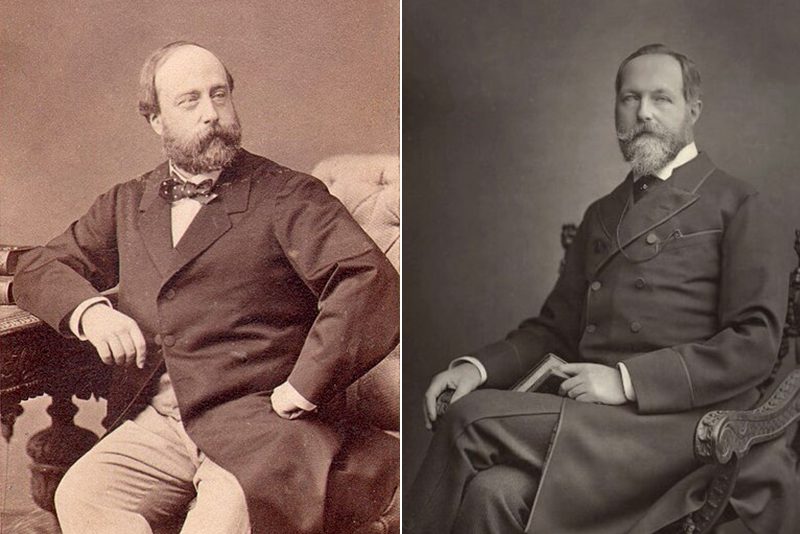
- Henri d'Artois (left), grandson of Charles X and Legitimist pretender, and Prince Philippe, Count of Paris (right), grandson of Louis Philippe I and Orléanist pretender.
- Date: October 14 – October 31, 1873
- Timeline; September 4, 1870: Fall of the Empire: the Provisional Government of National Defense continues the war against Germany until January 29, 1871. February 8, 1871: Legislative elections: the royalists obtain a large majority. March 1, 1871: Official deposition of Napoleon III; July 5, 1871: Return of Henri d'Artois to France; May 24, 1873: Resignation of President Adolphe Thiers; the royalist Patrice de MacMahon is elected to office. October 14, 1873: The royalist commission offers the throne to Henri d'Artois, who accepts the constitutional project. October 31, 1873: Henri d'Artois refuses the tricolor flag: the royalist deputies turn away from him, the commission is dissolved and the project canceled. February 24 – July 16, 1875: Constitutional laws: the republic asserts itself and solidifies. October 14 – October 27, 1877: Legislative elections: the republicans obtain the majority January 5, 1879: Senate elections: faced with the rout of the monarchists, Patrice de MacMahon resigns on January 30; August 24, 1883: Henri d'Artois dies without issue. August 14, 1884: The constitution is amended to secure the republic. June 22, 1886: The law of exile is passed.

The project of a Third Restoration (Note: (after the First Restoration in 1814 and the Second Restoration in 1815)) arose in the early 1870s to reestablish the monarchy in France. The project was conceived and prepared following the fall of the Second Empire in 1870, the Paris Commune, and the 1871 legislative elections, giving the National Assembly a royalist majority.

Henri d'Artois, Count of Chambord and grandson of King Charles X, was the leading candidate for the throne. His legitimacy became indisputable among the royalists after his cousin, Philippe, Count of Paris and leader of the Orléanists, agreed to recognize him as the sole claimant. Called "Henri V" (Note: During the week following July Revolution of 1830, between the abdications of his own grandfather and uncle and the Duke of Orléans's proclamation as King of the French, he was accepted by some as de jure King Henri V, but never officially acclaimed.) by his supporters, the Count of Chambord prepared to enter Paris.

While awaiting his return, Marshal Patrice de MacMahon was elected President of the Republic and organized a peaceful transition. However, the disagreements between Chambord and the Orléanists, as well as the growing strength of the Republicans in the Assembly during the first decade of the French Third Republic, made any attempt at restoring the Bourbons difficult. Due to political divisions and the Count of Chambord's hesitation and refusal to compromise on key symbols such as the tricolor flag, the negotiations collapsed in 1873 with failure to achieve agreement and never regained momentum.

While Patrice de MacMahon continued on as President and was supportive of the monarchy, the passage of the Constitutional Laws of 1875, the 1877 legislative elections and the January 1879 senatorial elections confirmed the rise of the Republicans and the decline of the royalists. Lacking a majority, MacMahon was forced to step down and the project was abandoned.

== Context ==
=== Fall of the Second Empire (1870) ===
In August 1870, as France under Napoleon III suffered severe defeats in the war against Prussia, the Count of Chambord left Frohsdorf intending to enlist; on September 1, 1870, he issued an appeal to "repel the invasion and save at all costs the honor of France and the integrity of its territory."

On September 4, 1870, the Second Empire collapsed after the defeat at Sedan. Since Bismarck demanded to negotiate the future peace treaty with a government elected by the French people, legislative elections were held in February 1871.

The new Assembly had 222 more or less radical Republican deputies, compared to 416 monarchists, mainly split between Legitimists (182 deputies) supporting Henri d'Artois and Orléanists (214 deputies) supporting Philippe d'Orléans, along with a small minority of Bonapartists (20 seats, with only 4 deputies). Meeting in Bordeaux on February 18, the Assembly appointed Adolphe Thiers, a former minister under King Louis Philippe I, as head of the executive power of the French Republic.

== Legitimist project (1871–1873) ==
=== Return of the Count of Chambord ===
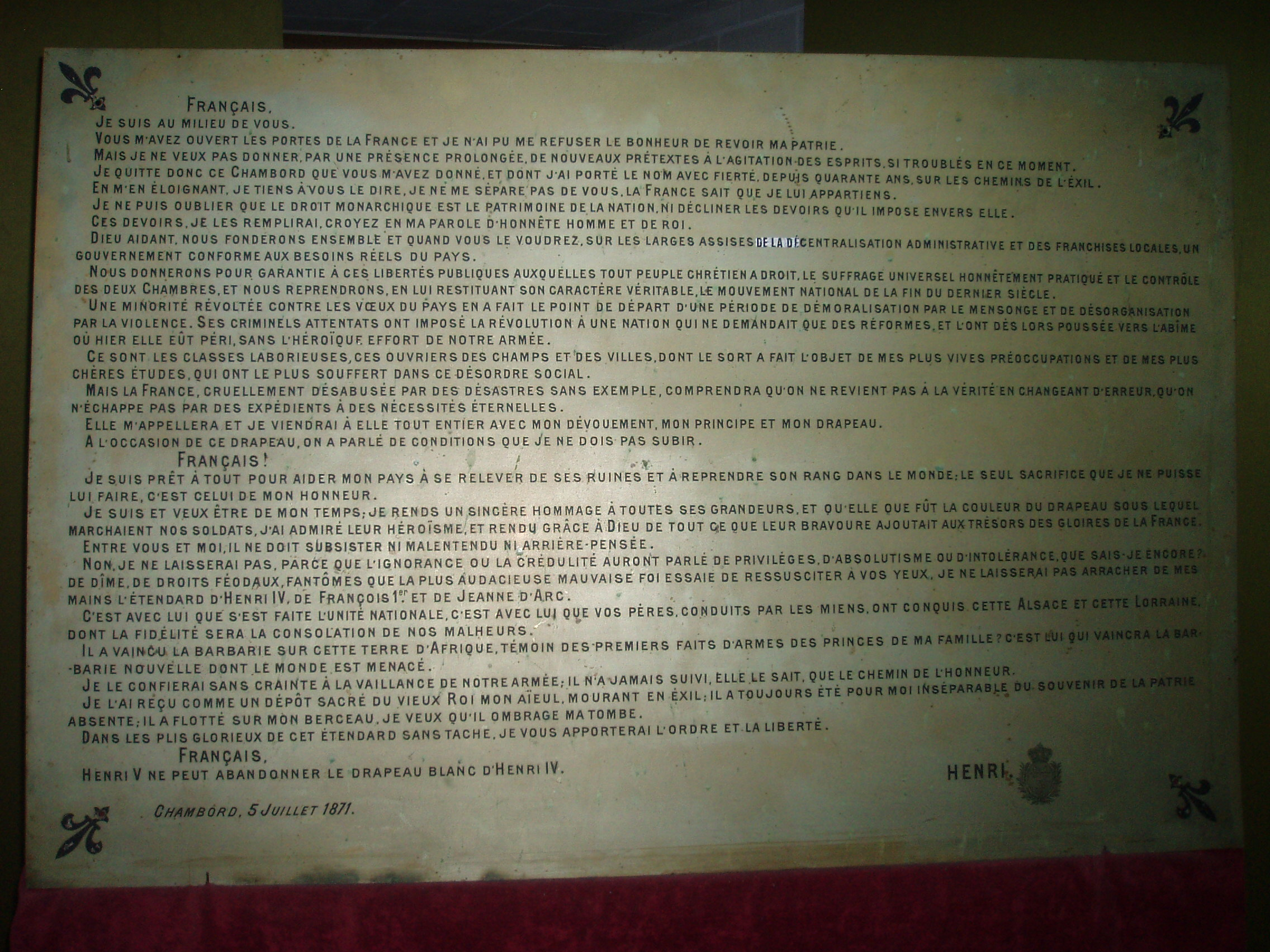
Plaque, at the château de Chambord, of the 5 July 1871 declaration, known as the "declaration of the white flag" (déclaration du drapeau blanc), by Henri, Count of Chambord (Henri V).

Henri insisted that he would accept the crown only on condition that France abandon its tricolour flag (associated with the French Revolution) and return to the use of the fleur de lys flag, comprising the historic royal arms of France.

He received numerous representatives of his supporters from all social classes, and these meetings convinced him that the people of France were not so attached to the tricolor flag. He left France and issued a manifesto on July 5, 1871, published in L'Union, in which he declared:

I will not let the standard of Henri IV, François I, and Joan of Arc be torn from my hands. I received it as a sacred deposit from the dying old king, my grandfather, in exile; it has always been for me inseparable from the memory of the absent homeland; it waved over my cradle, and I want it to shade my grave. In the glorious folds of this stainless standard, I will bring you order and freedom. Frenchmen, Henri V cannot abandon the white flag of Henri IV.

This manifesto divided the royalists: some approved of the white flag, others considered the tricolor flag acceptable. Furthermore, the manifesto was mocked by the political left and alienated moderate supporters and Orléanists.

Despite efforts by royalist leaders, including Patrice de MacMahon, the monarchist factions could not reconcile their differences. Henry rejected a compromise whereby the fleur-de-lys would be the new king's personal standard, and the tricolour would remain the national flag. Pope Pius IX, upon hearing Henri's decision, notably remarked "And all that, all that for a napkin!"

=== Thiers government ===
The French tricolore with the royal crown and fleur-de-lys was possibly designed by the count in his younger years as a compromise

The Count of Chambord again clarified his position in January 1872 through a new manifesto, in which he proclaimed:

I do not need to justify the path I have chosen. [...] I will not allow the monarchical principle, the heritage of France, the last hope of its greatness and freedoms, to be undermined after preserving it intact for forty years. [...] I am not raising a new flag, I am maintaining the flag of France [...]. Outside the national principle of monarchical heredity, without which I am nothing and with which I can do everything, where will our alliances be? [...] Nothing will shake my resolutions, nothing will wear out my patience, and no one, under any pretext, will get me to consent to become the legitimate king of the Revolution.

On May 24, 1873, President Thiers declared before the National Assembly that "the monarchy is impossible." He added: "There is only one throne, and it cannot be occupied by three", referring to Chambord (Legitimist), Philippe d'Orléans (Orléanist), and Louis-Napoléon, son of Napoleon III (Bonapartist).

Alphonse Daudet wrote in October 1873: "Let him come quickly, our Henri [...] we are so eager to see him."

=== Failure of the Legitimists ===
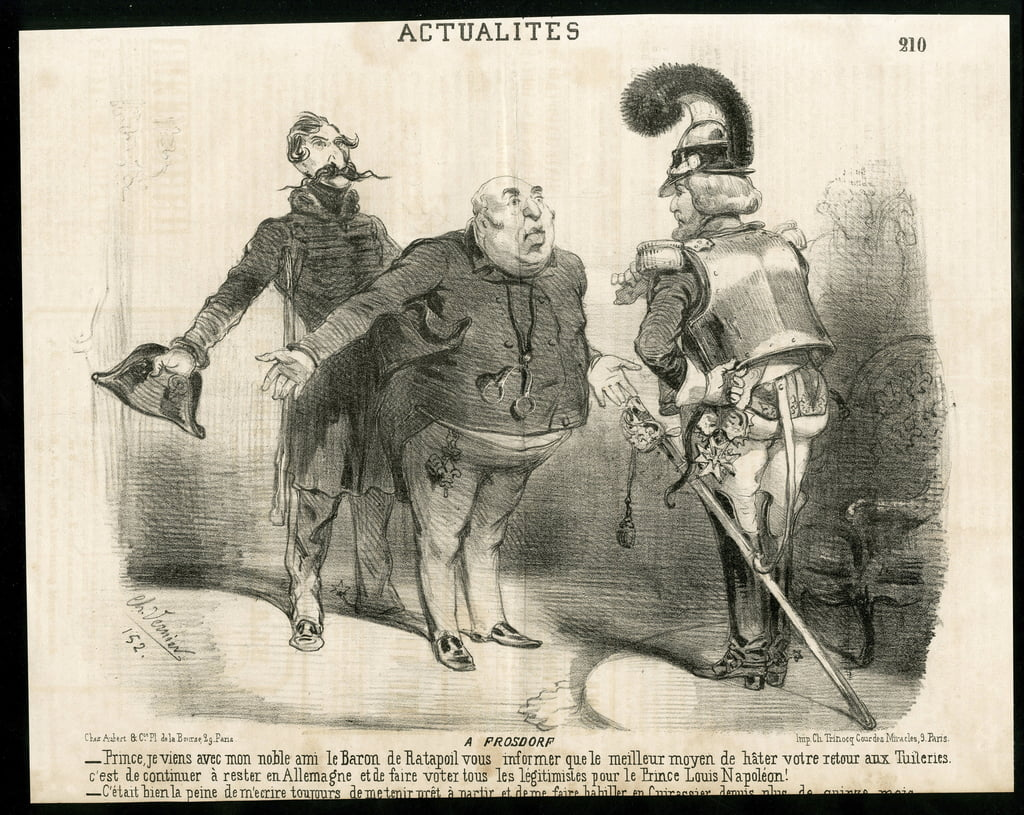
Lithograph by Charles Vernier. Legitimist Berryer and Bonapartist Ratapoil visit the Count of Chambord.

At the end of October 1873, the negotiations were taken seriously by the Paris Stock Exchange, which rose after the news.

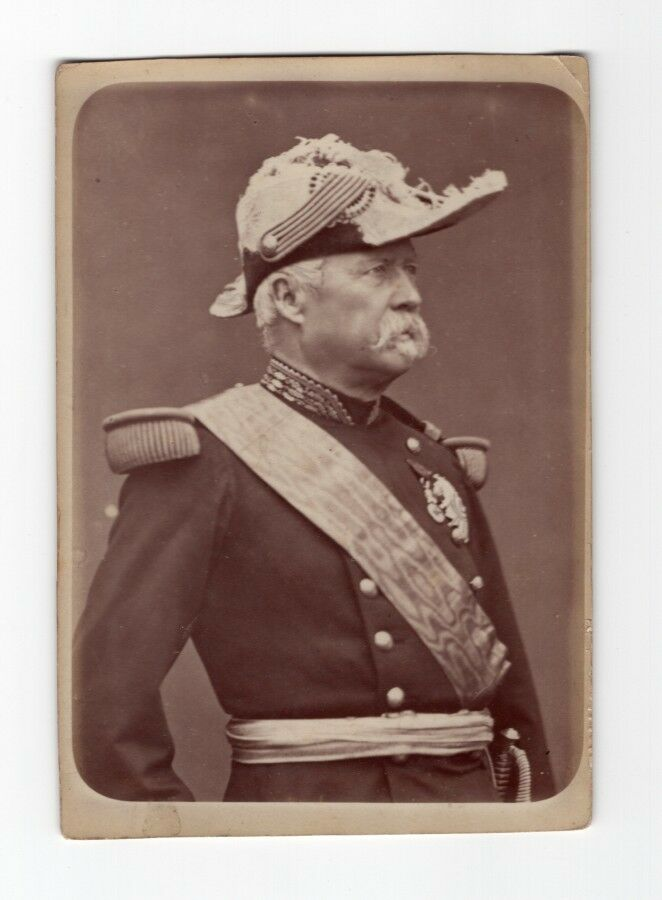
Patrice de MacMahon, Marshal of France and royalist deputy, took power after the resignation of Thiers with the support of the Orléans family.

Due to Charles Savary's misrepresentation of Chambord's statements, some newspapers even claimed he had finally accepted the tricolor flag. Wanting to disavow this interpretation, the pretender published the Letter to Chesnelong on October 27, 1873, in the Legitimist newspaper L'Union, where he stated: "Public opinion, driven by a current that I deplore, claimed that I finally consented to become the legitimate king of the Revolution. [...] Yesterday's demands give me a measure of tomorrow's expectations, and I cannot begin a strong and restorative reign with an act of weakness."

Henri reaffirmed his attachment to the white flag. Now, unable to hope for a majority and with broad political consensus, the National Assembly dissolved the royalist commission preparing for the monarchy's restoration on October 31. The publication of the Letter to Chesnelong dashed the hopes at the Paris Stock Exchange.

Chambord then made an effort to regain his chances: he secretly returned to France on November 9, 1873, and settled in Versailles, 5 rue Saint-Louis, at the home of one of his supporters, Count de Vanssay. On November 12, he asked the Duke of Blacas to request a meeting with Marshal MacMahon, President of the Republic. Chambord likely intended to enter the Chamber of Deputies, supported by the President, and obtain the monarchy's restoration through enthusiastic parliamentarians. But MacMahon refused to meet him, considering that his role as head of the executive power forbade it.

== Orléanist hopes ==
=== The return of the Orléans ===
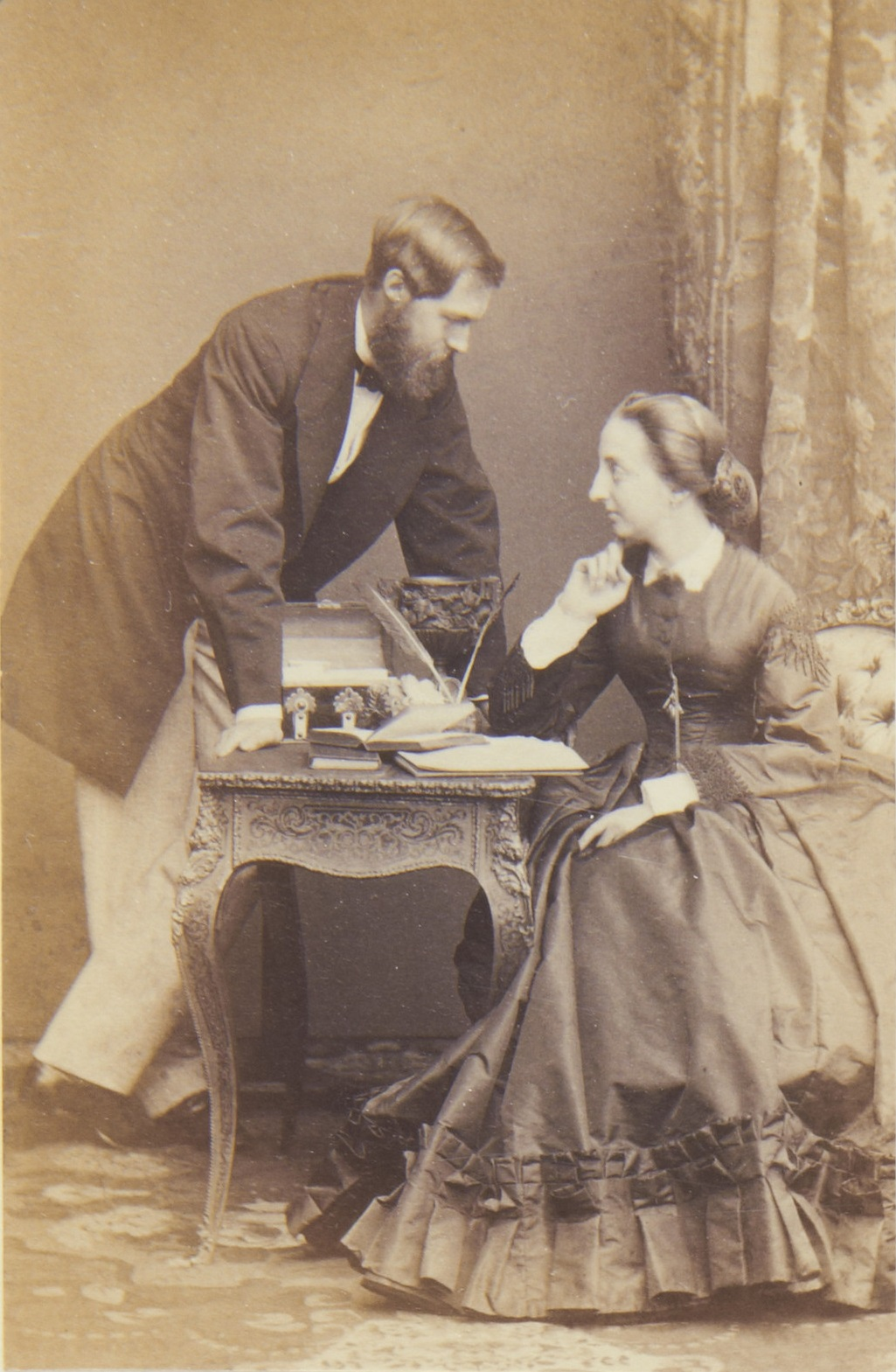
The Count and Countess of Paris.

==== MacMahon ====
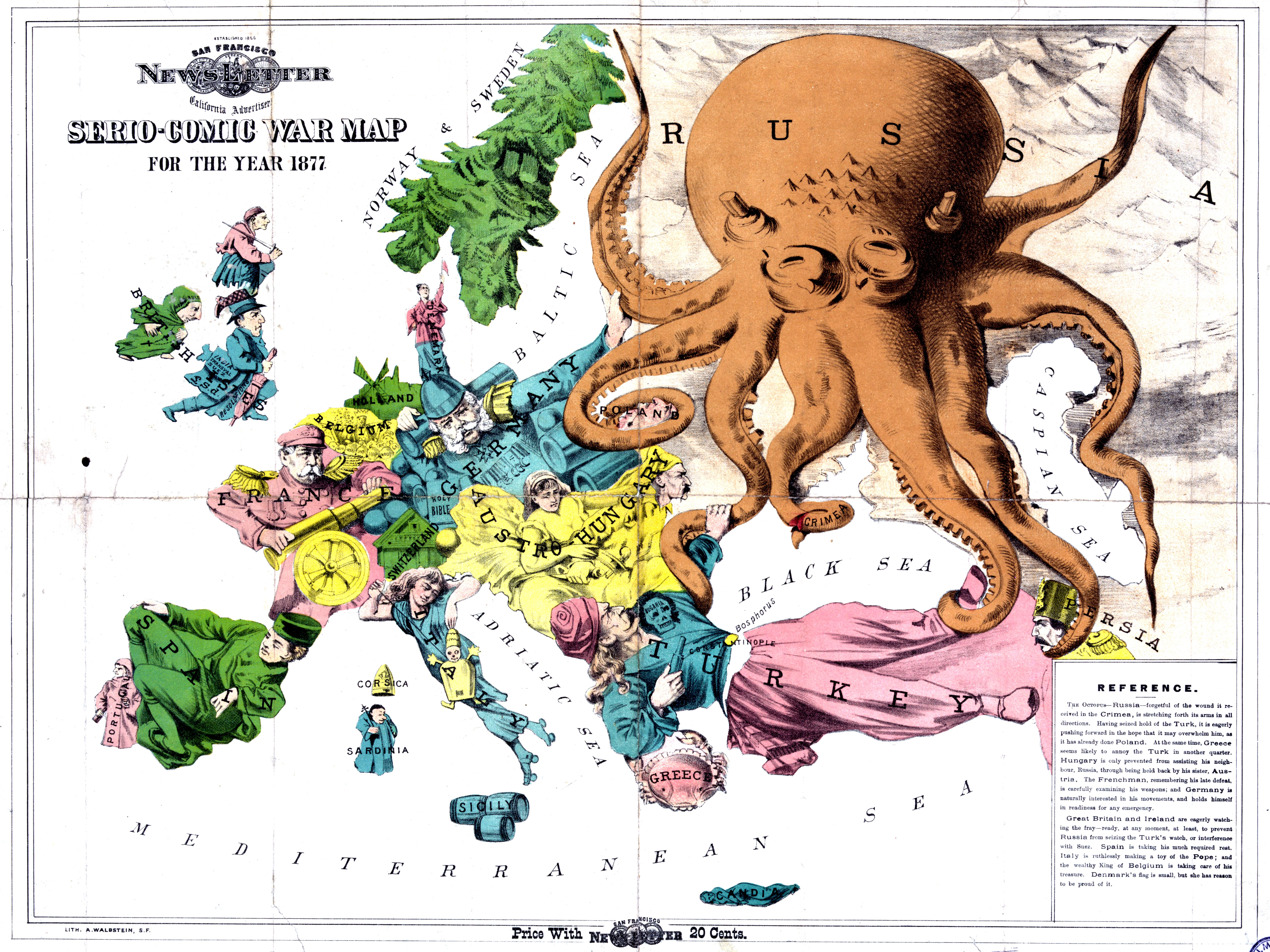
Map of Europe in 1877.

The Count of Chambord was the last legitimate male-line descendant of Louis, Duke of Burgundy and the next senior line after him, but before the Count of Paris, were the descendants of Philip V of Spain, who had renounced their right to the French Crown during the Peace of Utrecht. The Orléanists therefore agreed to support the Count of Chambord's claim to the throne in 1873, with the expectation that upon his death, the Count of Paris would succeed him as the senior legitimate male-line Capetian not disinherited by the Renounciations of Utrecht.

The Count of Paris could not accede to the throne as long as the latter had not officially renounced the crown. President Patrice de MacMahon then agreed to the request of the Duke of Aumale and extended his term of office while awaiting the "abdication" or death of the Count of Chambord. Only after that would the Count of Paris become "King of the French" under the name "Philippe VII" (Note: For two days after the French Revolution of 1848 he was briefly considered King Louis Philippe II between his grandfather's abdication and the proclamation of the French Second Republic. However, he was never acclaimed just like Henri himself.). In Orleanist circles, a saying began to circulate: "My God, please open the eyes of the Count of Chambord—or else close them for him!"

Following the failure of the restoration in 1873, the Orléanist-dominated parliament sought to maintain a conservative government until the legitimist pretender, the Count of Chambord, died. President MacMahon, with the support of the monarchist majority, installed a government led by the Orléanist Duke Albert de Broglie. This government, which came to be known as the "Moral Order" (Ordre Moral) government, was a conservative coalition that pursued repressive policies against the left, removing many republican civil servants and restricting public assembly. The government's goal was to suppress republicanism and prepare the country for an eventual restoration when the Count of Paris could take the throne.

==== 1877 Legislative elections and failure of the Orléanists ====
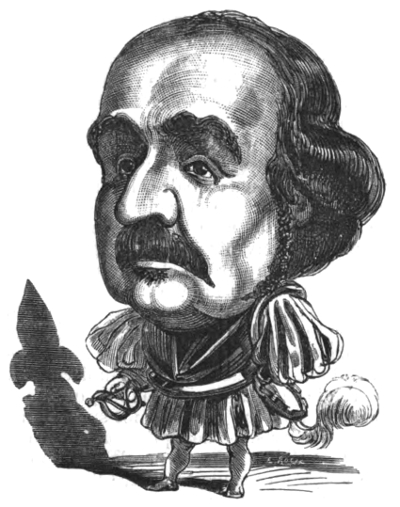
Satirical portrait of the Duke of Broglie.

In 1875, a new Constitution of the French Third Republic was passed establishing a framework for republican governance, and the Republic asserted and solidified itself. The subsequent 1877 legislative elections gave the Republican Left a majority of 120 seats further weakening royalist influence, and the de Broglie ministry resigned on November 19. MacMahon initially attempted to form a caretaker government led by General de Rochebouët, but since the Chamber refused to engage with him, Rochebouët resigned the very next day, and the president was forced to recall Dufaure, a moderate Republican, to head a left-leaning government.

The senatorial elections of January 5, 1879, handed the upper chamber over to the Republican Left, ending the royalist majority. MacMahon, no longer having any parliamentary support, chose to resign on January 30, 1879, after refusing to sign the decree that would remove certain Orleanist generals from their commands.

The Count of Chambord died four year later in 1883. The Third Restoration had failed. The next year Article 89 was added to the Constitution, which prevented any amendment removing "the republican form of government". This is still an Entrenched clause in the current Constitution of the French Fifth Republic. Between 1886 and 1950 the Law of Exile legally banished all three pretender dynasties from the Republic.

Many Legitimists accepted Philippe's succession, as Henri himself appeared to have reluctantly done. This is known as Legitimism-Orléanism, Fusionist Orléanism, or Unionist Orléanism. However, some Legitimists chose to disregard Henri's statements and declared Utrecht a violation of Fundamental laws of the Kingdom of France, choosing to support the so-called Blancs d'Espagne.

== See also ==
- Henri, Count of Chambord
- Prince Philippe, Count of Paris
- Legitimists
- Orléanist
- Adolphe Thiers
- Patrice de MacMahon
- French Third Republic
- Moral Order
