= Auguste Boulard =

Auguste Boulard may refer to:

- Auguste Boulard (painter, 1825-1897), French painter
- Auguste Boulard (painter, 1852-1927), French painter and son of the above
