= Charles de Franqueville =

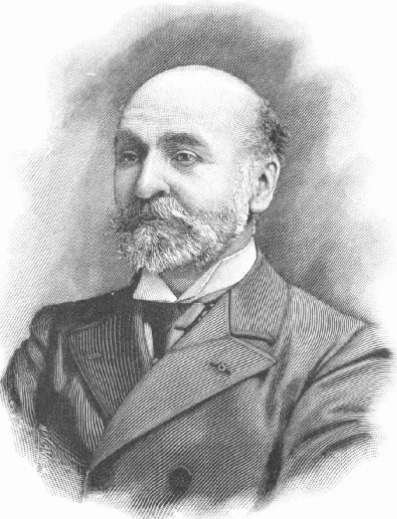

Amable Charles Franquet, comte de Franqueville (1 January 1840 – 28 December 1919) was a French conseiller d'État, lawyer, and scholar, known for his work on British institutions.

== Life ==
The only child of the French engineer Alfred Charles Ernest Franquet, comte de Franqueville, he followed in his steps and joined the Conseil d'État, rising to the rank of conseiller d'État.

Franquet was created a hereditary Papal count in 1870 by Pope Pius IX. He was also an Officer of the Legion of Honour.

He was elected to the Académie des sciences morales et politiques in 1888 and became a corresponding fellow of the British Academy in 1904. In 1901, he received an honorary LL.D. from the University of Glasgow.

He died at the Château de la Muette in 1919.

== Family ==
The Comte married in the private chapel at London House, St. James′s Square on 16 February 1903 Lady Sophia Matilda Palmer, third child of Roundell Palmer, 1st Earl of Selborne.

== Works ==
- Commentaire de la loi du 16 septembre 1807 sur le dessèchement des marais, in-8°, 134 pages. Paris. Thunot, 1860
- Étude sur les sociétés de secours mutuels en Angleterre, in-8°, 52 pages. Paris, P. Dupont, 1863
- Les Institutions politiques, judiciaires et administratives de l'Angleterre, 1863
- Études sur les sociétés de secours mutuels d'Angleterre, 1863
- Les Écoles publiques en Angleterre, 1869
- Du Régime des travaux publics en Angleterre : rapport adressé à M. le ministre des Travaux publics, 4 vol., 1874
- Le Gouvernement et le parlement britanniques, 3 vol., 1887
- Rapport sur le prix Le Dissez de Penanrun, 1889
- Le Système judiciaire de la Grande-Bretagne, 2 vol., 1893
- La Justice criminelle en France et en Angleterre, 1894
- L'Institut de France : son origine, ses transformations, son organisation, 1895
- Le Premier siècle de l'Institut de France : 25 octobre 1795-25 octobre 1895, 2 vol., 1895-1896
- Marie de Franqueville, sœur Sainte-Catherine de Sienne au Tiers-Ordre de saint Dominique, 1844-1900, 1903
- Histoire de Bourbilly, 1907
- Le Château de La Muette, 1915
- Lady Sophia Palmer, comtesse de Franqueville (1852-1915), 1917
- Souvenirs 1840-1919, 1922
