= Félix Martin-Feuillée =

French politician

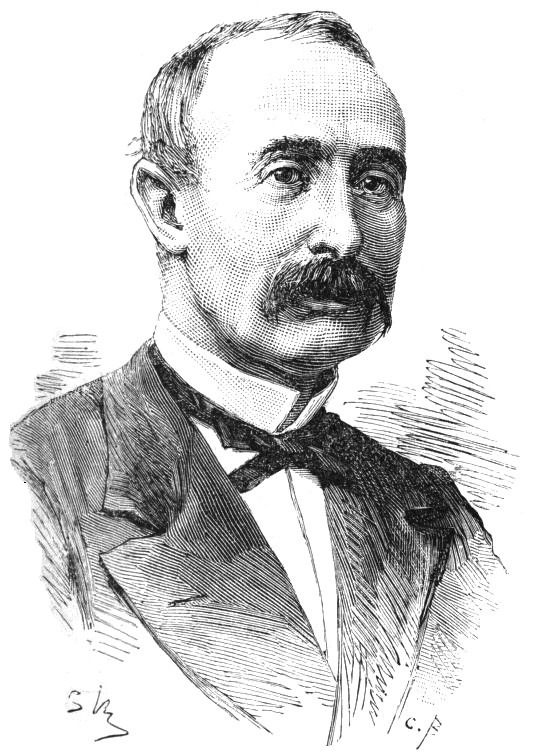

Minister of Justice
- In office 21 February 1883 – 6 April 1885

Deputy Secretary of the Ministry of the Interior and Cult
- In office 4 March 1879 – 28 December 1879
- Prime Minister: William Henry Waddington

Deputy Secretary of the Ministry of Justice
- In office 29 December 1879 – 30 January 1882
- Prime Minister: Léon Gambetta, Jules Ferry

Personal details
- Born: 25 November 1830 Rennes, France
- Died: 5 August 1898 (aged 18)
- Education: University of Rennes
- Occupation: Politician

Félix Martin-Feuillée (25 November 1830 – 5 August 1898) was a French politician of the French Third Republic. He was born in Rennes, France. He graduated from the University of Rennes in 1854. He was a member of the Chamber of Deputies of France from 1876 to 1889. He was deputy secretary of the ministry of the interior and cult (4 March – 28 December 1879) in the government of William Henry Waddington. He was deputy secretary of the ministry of justice (29 December 1879 – 30 January 1882) in the governments of Léon Gambetta and Jules Ferry. He was minister of justice (21 February 1883 – 6 April 1885).

== Sources ==
- "Félix Martin-Feuillée", in Adolphe Robert and Gaston Cougny, Dictionnaire des parlementaires français (1789–1891), Bourloton, Paris, 1889 Edition details Wikisource
