= 1879 French Senate election =

- January 5, 1879

82 of the 300 seats in the Senate 151 seats needed for a majority
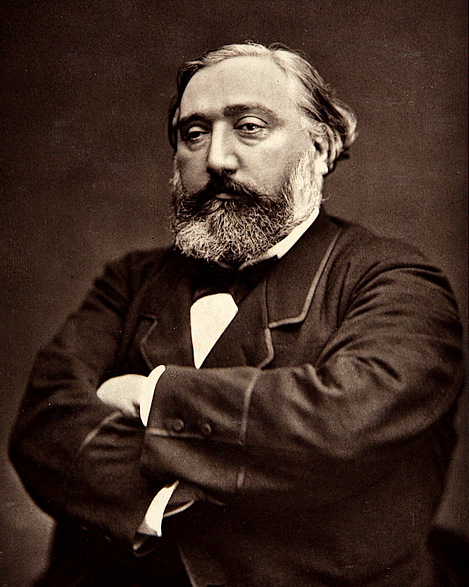

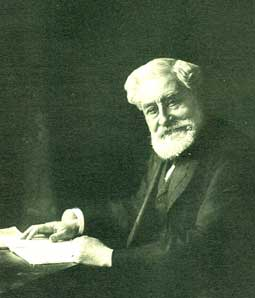
	Majority party	Minority party
Leader	Léon Gambetta (non-candidate)	Camille de Meaux
Party	Republican	Monarchist
Seats before	149	151
Seats won	66	16
Seats after	174	126
Seat change	▲25	▼25
President of the Senate before election
Gaston d'Audiffret-Pasquier
Monarchist
Elected President of the Senate
Louis Martel
Republican

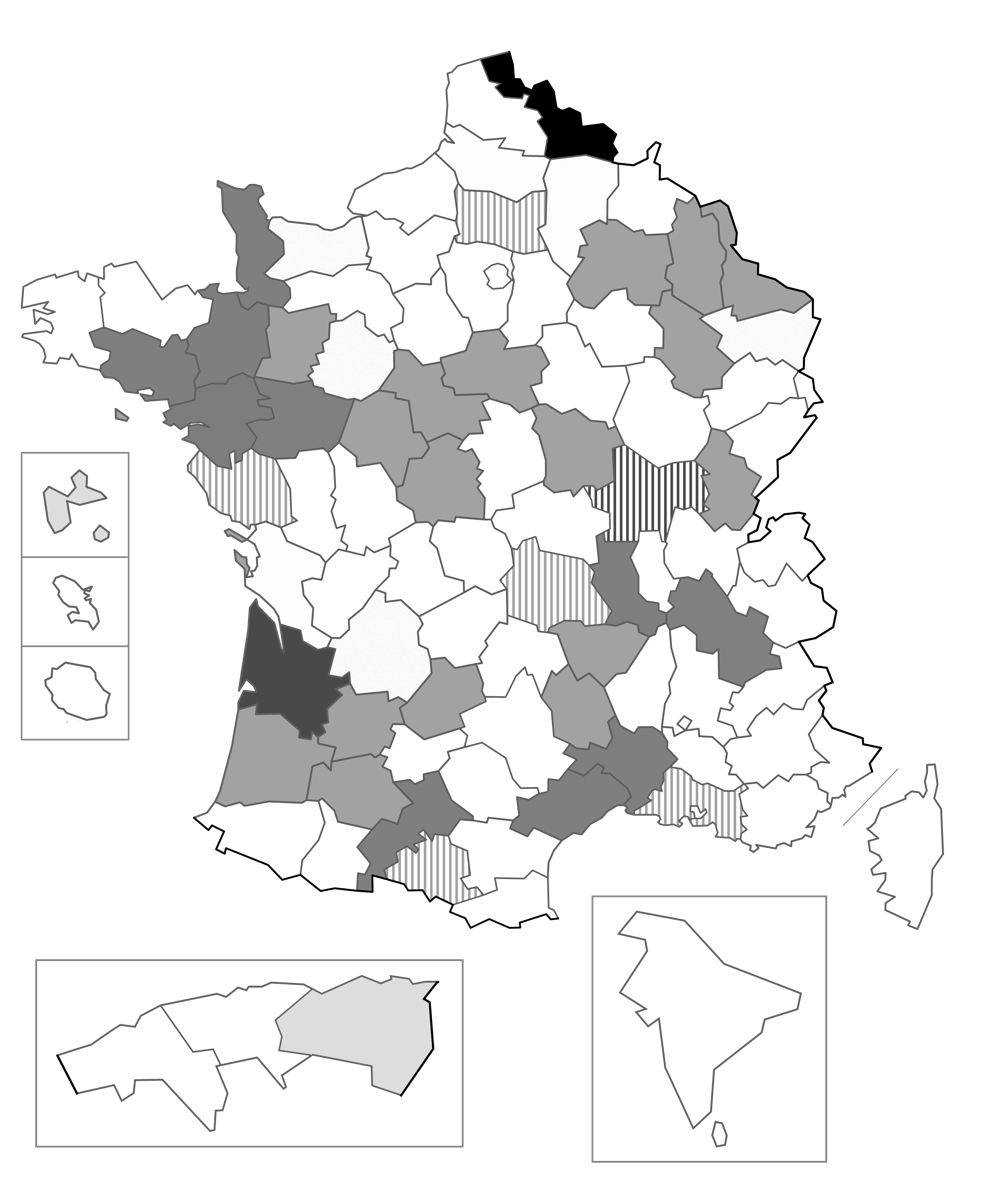
Geographical distribution of seats up for election in 1879. (Note: Following the 1870 war, France lost the Alsace-Moselle departments. Overseas territories with Senate representation included the three departments of French Algeria, Guadeloupe, Martinique, Réunion, and the French establishments in India.) Five senators renewed Four senators renewed Three senators renewed Two senators renewed One senator renewed

Senate elections were held in France on January 5, 1879 as part of the triennial renewal for Series B, marking the first partial renewal of the Senate under the Third Republic.

== Electoral system ==
The 1879 Senate election followed the electoral framework established by the Constitutional Laws of 1875 for the Third Republic. Senators were elected indirectly by a college of electors in each department, comprising National Assembly deputies, general councilors, municipal councilors, and additional delegates from larger communes. This system, designed to favor rural and conservative interests, allocated voting power disproportionately to smaller communes, where local notables held significant influence.

For the Series B renewal, 82 seats were contested across 29 metropolitan departments (from Gard to Nord), the department of Constantine in French Algeria, and Martinique. Each department elected a fixed number of senators based on its population, ranging from one to five, with replacements for deceased senators also included. Voting occurred in a single round, with electors casting ballots for candidates in a majority system, where the candidate with the most votes won, provided they secured an absolute majority; otherwise, a second round could be held. This indirect system reinforced the Senate's role as a conservative counterbalance to the directly elected Chamber of Deputies.

== Seats up for election ==
The seats up for election in Series B were distributed across various departments, with the number of senators renewed varying from one to five per department, plus replacements for deceased senators.

== Results ==
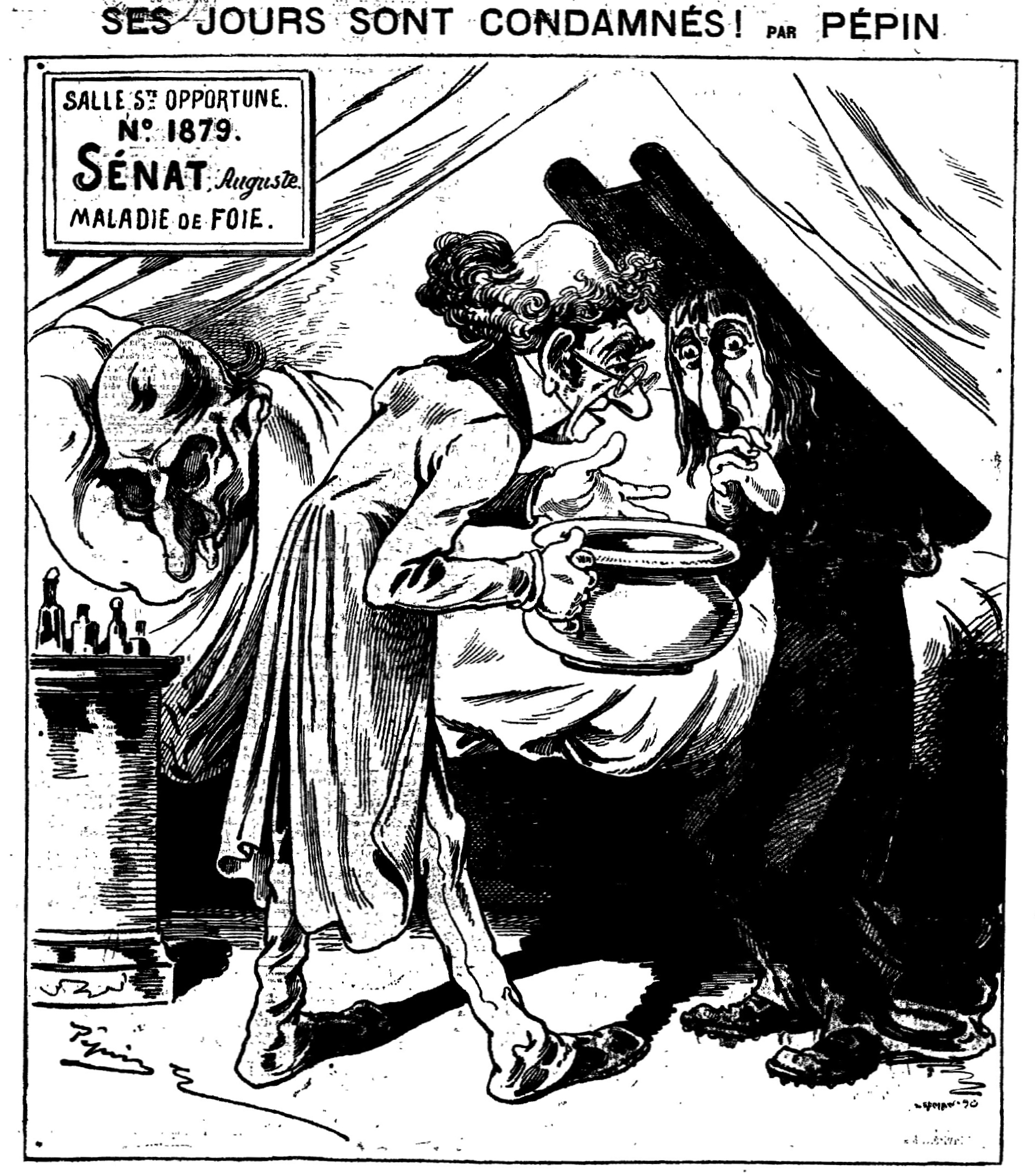
1878 caricature from Le Grelot, predicting the conservatives' loss of Senate majority.

Series B covered 29 metropolitan departments, listed alphabetically from Gard to Nord, plus the department of Constantine and the colony of Martinique. The right held a majority in this series, particularly in the Catholic western departments with Chouan or Vendée traditions, including Indre-et-Loire, Loire-Inférieure, Loir-et-Cher, Mayenne, Maine-et-Loire, Manche, and Morbihan. The Gard represented the Midi blanc, a legitimist stronghold. Catholic areas in the south and east of the Massif Central were also included, such as Loire, Haute-Loire, and Lozère.

Following the 1878 municipal elections, where republicans gained ground, the right suffered a significant defeat. Of the 82 senators elected, 66 were from the republican camp, compared to 16 conservatives, including 13 monarchists. The defeat of Camille de Meaux, a former Minister of Agriculture, in the Forez highlighted the scale of the loss.

Political tendency	Outgoing seats	Seats won	Total seats
Legitimists	64	13	126
Bonapartists	64	3	126
Republicans	18	66	174
Total	82	82	300
Source: Conord

== Consequences ==
The election gave republicans a majority in the Senate, previously controlled by monarchists by a single vote. The new Senate President was Louis Joseph Martel, a life senator from the conservative republican Centre-left group.

This pivotal event led to the resignation of President Patrice de MacMahon and triggered the republican purge of the civil service.

== See also ==
- 1877 French legislative election
- 1881 French legislative election
- Constitutional Laws of 1875
- French Third Republic
- 16 May 1877 crisis
- Republican Union (France)
- Legitimist
- Bonapartism
