= Albert Grévy =

French lawyer and politician

Jules Philippe Louis Albert Grévy
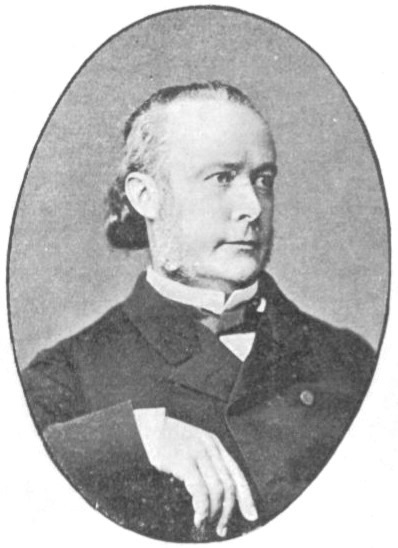
- Grévy from Le Monde illustré, n° 2208, 22 July 1899

Representative of Doubs
- In office 8 February 1871 – 15 March 1880

Governor-General of Algeria
- In office 15 March 1879 – 26 November 1881
- Preceded by: Antoine Chanzy
- Succeeded by: Louis Tirman

Senator for Life
- In office 6 March 1880 – 10 July 1899
- Preceded by: Adolphe Crémieux

Personal details
- Born: Mont-sous-Vaudrey, Jura, France
- Died: Mont-sous-Vaudrey, Jura, France
- Occupation: Lawyer, politician

Jules Philippe Louis Albert Grévy (23 August 1823 – 10 July 1899) was a French lawyer and politician. He represented Doubs in the National Assembly and then the Chamber of Deputies from 1871 to 1880. He was Governor-General of Algeria from 1879 to 1881, and a Senator for Life from 1880 until his death in 1899.

== Birth and family ==
Albert Grévy was born on 23 August 1823 in Mont-sous-Vaudrey, Jura. His paternal grandfather, Nicolas Grévy (1736–1812), was the son of farmers in Aumont, moved to Mont-sous-Vaudrey during the French Revolution and bought the property of la Grangerie. He was a justice of the peace. His parents were François Hyacinthe Grevy (1773–1857) and Jeanne Gabrielle Planet (1782–1855). Albert's father had become chief of a battalion of volunteers in the Year II and had fought for the Republic until the Consulate. He operated a tile factory on his property.

Albert was the younger brother of Jules Grévy (1807–1891), the future President of France. His other brother was Paul Louis Jules Grevy^{(fr)} (1820–1914), who became General of Division and was elected to the Senate in 1880 to represent Jura. He also had three older sisters. Albert Grévy married Marie Cambeur (1830–1919). They had a son, Léon Louis Gabriel Grévy (b. 1853), who became a Master of Requests at the Council of State.

== Lawyer (1850–70) ==
Albert Grévy followed his older brother Jules in studying at the Faculty of Law of Paris, and enrolled at the Paris bar. Grévy made an impressive debut in the Conférence des avocats (1850–52). Grévy was a member of the Conférence Molé debating society in 1851. From 1852 he practiced in Besançon, where he became Bâtonnier. He contributed to the journal Le Doubs. As leader of the democratic opposition to the government of the Second French Empire he openly fought the plebiscite of 8 May 1870 in a series of meetings at the Grand-Théâtre in Besançon. Due to his moderate Republican views on 6 October 1870 the Government of National Defense appointed him Commissioner General in the departments of Doubs, Jura and Haute-Saône, but he soon left this position.

== Deputy (1871–80) ==
Grévy was elected Representative for Doubs in the National Assembly on 8 February 1871. He won by 36,910 votes out of 53,134. He sat with the Opportunist Republican parliamentary group, Gauche républicaine, of which he became president. He supported the government of Adolphe Thiers and took part in several important debates. He was rapporter of the law on apportionment of compensation for acts of war, the commission of inquiry into Bonapartist actions (Girerd Affair), draft law on the press and the raising on the state of siege. He tried to pull together the various left-wing minority factions to work together on passing the constitutional laws. He opposed the government of 24 May 1873, and spoke against the septennat, state of siege, law on mayors and the ministry of Albert de Broglie.

Grévy was elected Deputy for Doubs on 20 February 1876. He ran for the first district of Besançon and won 6,985 out of 9,095 votes. He was again president of the Republican left. He handed over this position to M. Leblond on 24 January 1877 but remained a member of the executive committee of the group. In 1877 he was vice-chairman of the budget committee. After the 16 May 1877 crisis he was one of the 363 opponents of the Fourtou–De Broglie ministry.

Grévy was reelected on 14 October 1877, holding office until 15 March 1880. He won 8,282 votes against 1,579 votes for the official candidate and monarchist M. Boysson d'Ecole. He was appointed a member of the Commission of Inquiry into the election and voted for invalidation of the elections of several deputies of the right. He supported the Dufaure cabinet and spoke in favour of the Jules Ferry laws on education.

== Governor-General of Algeria (1879–81) ==
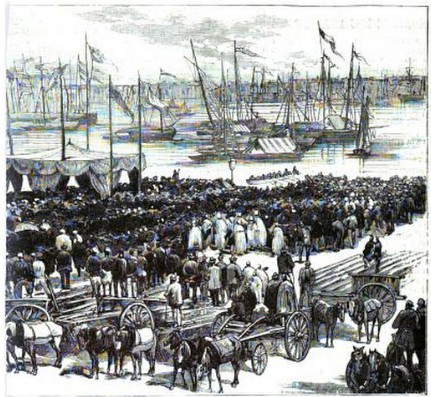
The arrival in Algiers of Albert Grévy, Governor General of Algeria, 27 April 1879

By decree of 15 March 1879, renewed on 15 September 1879, Grévy was temporarily assigned the position of Governor-General of Algeria. This was the first attempt to have a civilian in charge of civil and political life in Algeria, sponsored by Grévy's brother Jules Grévy, President of France. It was strongly criticized by the conservatives. Grévy encountered difficulties that included the need to suppress a revolt of the Kabyle people in Batna in May 1879. There were frequent conflicts with the military authorities, which were often discussed in parliament. He also had disagreements with the General Secretary of Algeria.

Grévy was a conscientious and hard-working administrator, but his obsession with detail led to delays when action was needed. He was the first governor to be neither a general nor an admiral, and this may have encouraged a revolt that broke out in the south of Oran Province. In March 1881 he responded as government commissioner to the interpellation by the deputy Gaston Thomson on the arbitrary imprisonment of Arabs in Constantine Province. On 30 June 1881 he was attacked by Rémy Jacques for having caused the insurrection in Sud-Oran through his negligence.

Grévy's system of open receptions at the government palace was also criticized. The assorted civilians who invaded the functions were not always well-behaved, and sometimes squabbled over food at the buffet. Guests were later only admitted with invitation cards, which had to be presented at the door. The "decrees of attachment" of 6 September 1881 markedly diminished Grévy's powers by giving control of many services to the relevant ministries. He was replaced as civil governor of Algeria on 26 November 1881 by Louis Tirman.

== Senator for Life (1880–99) ==
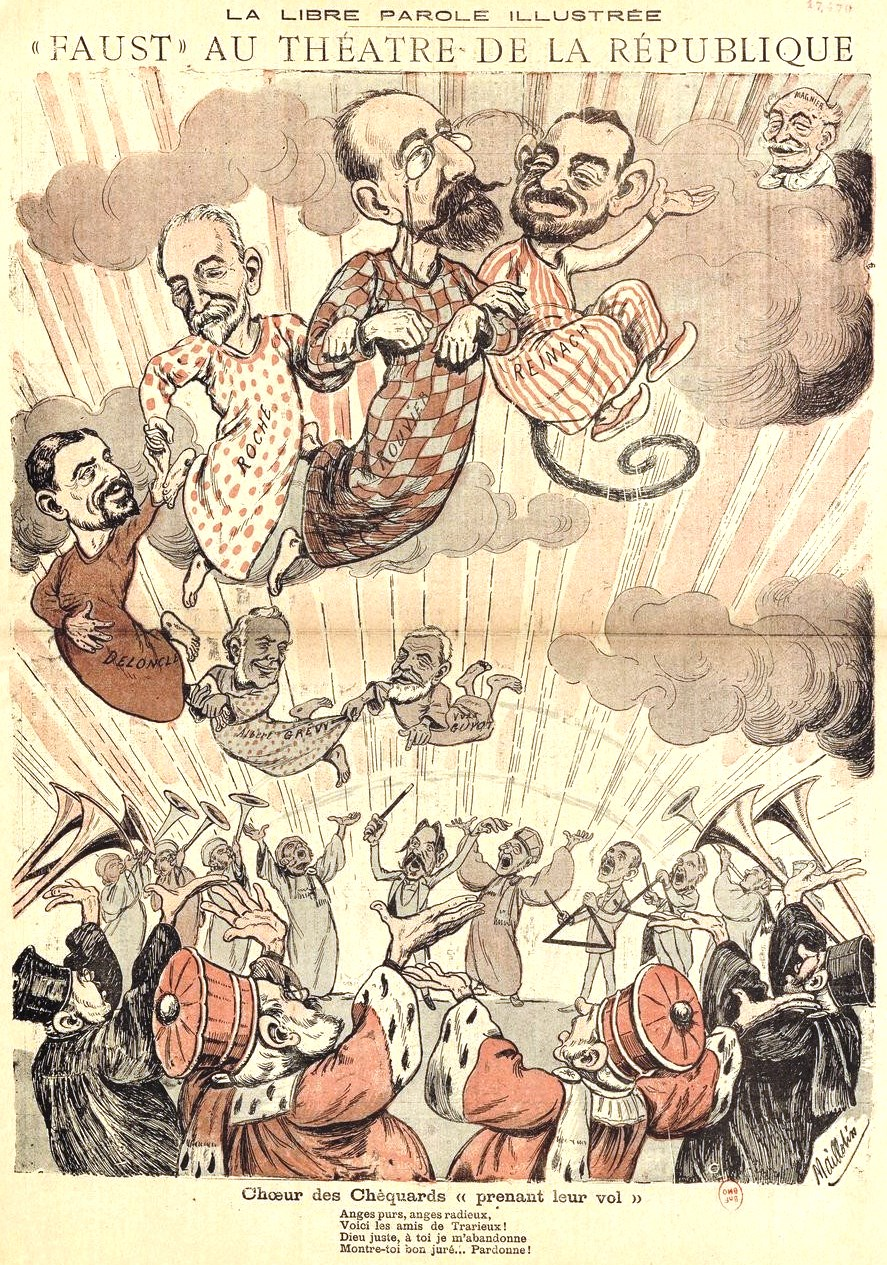
Faust at the Theater of the Republic: Choir of chéquards: (Note: The chéquards were politicians and journalists accused of accepting bribes to hide the lack of progress, financial issues and corruption of the company building the Panama Canal.) Reinach, Rouvier, Roche, Deloncle, Grévy and Guyot. La Libre Parole illustrée, 21 September 1895

On 6 March 1880 Grévy was elected to the Senate as a Senator for Life in place of Adolphe Crémieux, who had died. He received 152 votes out of 159. He sat with the left when his duties as Governor of Algeria allowed. Grévy was particularly interested in colonial questions, and was naturally a member of the Colonial Committee. He voted with the Republican majority, and voted for divorce, for the exile of the princes, for the new military law, for reinstatement of the district poll (13 February 1889) and for the draft Lisbonne law restricting freedom of the press. He abstained on the process to be followed by the Senate against General Boulanger.

Grévy was implicated in the Panama scandals, and on 20 December 1892 the government asked parliament to authorise his prosecution. He obtained dismissal of the case on 7 February 1893. The cases against Deputy Maurice Rouvier and Senators Grévy, Paul Devès and Léon Renault^{(fr)} were dismissed based on lack of evidence. Poor health effectively removed Grévy from Senate activity as early as 1892. He died in his house in Mont-sous-Vaudrey on 10 July 1899 at the age of 76.

== Publications ==
Albert Grévy published various parliamentary reports and proposals, including:

- Albert Grévy (1871), Rapport fait au nom de la commission chargée d'examiner la proposition de MM. Claude (de la Meurthe), Laflize, Berlet, Ancelon, Viox, tendant à faire supporter par toute la nation française les contributions de guerre, réquisitions et dommages matériels de toute nature causés par l'invasion (Assemblée nationale. Session 1871. N ° 259), Versailles: Impr. du Journal officiel / Assemblée nationale, p. 16
- Albert Grévy (1875), Rapport fait au nom de la commission chargée d'examiner le projet de loi ayant pour objet la répression des délits qui peuvent être commis par la voie de la presse ou par tous autres moyens de publication et la levée de l'état de siège (Assemblée nationale. 1875. N ° 3558), Versailles: Impr. de Cerf et fils / Assemblée nationale, p. 39
- Albert Grévy (1876), Rapport fait au nom de la Commission du budget sur le budget des dépenses de l'exercice 1877, (Ministère des affaires étrangères) (Chambre des députés, 1re législature, session 1876, n ° 322), Versailles: Impr. de Cerf et fils / Chambre des députés, p. 94
- Albert Grévy (1891), Rapport fait, au nom de la Commission des chemins de fer, chargée d'examiner le projet de loi, adopté par la Chambre des députés, portant approbation de la Convention signée à Berne, le 14 octobre 1890, entre la France, l'Allemagne l'Autriche-Hongrie, la Belgique, l'Italie, les Pays-Bas, le Luxembourg, la Russie et la Suisse, relativement au transport des marchandises par chemins de fer (Sénat. Session extraordinaire 1891. N ° 95), Paris: Impr. de P. Mouillot / Sénat, p. 87

== Sources ==
- Albert Grévy (in French), Assemblée nationale
- Albert Grévy (1823–1899) (in French), BnF: Bibliotheque nationale de France
- Anceau, Eric (1995), "GRÉVY Jules Philippe Louis Albert 1823–1899", in Jean Marie Mayeur; et al. (eds.), Les immortels du Sénat, 1875–1918: les cent seize inamovibles de la Troisième République (in French), Publications de la Sorbonne, ISBN 978-2-85944-273-6
- Jolly, Jean, ed. (1960), "GRÉVY (JULES, PHILIPPE, Louis, Albert)", Dictionnaire des parlementaires français de 1889 à 1940, Presses universitaires de France
- Mayeur, Jean Marie; Corbin, Alain; Schweitz, Arlette (1995), Les immortels du Sénat, 1875–1918: les cent seize inamovibles de la Troisième République (in French), Publications de la Sorbonne, ISBN 978-2-85944-273-6
- Raffy, Thierry, "Albert GREVY", Geneanet (in French)
- "Result of the Inquiry into the Panama Canal Scandals" (PDF), New York Times, 8 February 1893
- Robert, Adolphe; Cougny, Gaston (1889–1891), "GRÉVY (JULES-PHILIPPE-LOUIS-ALBERT)", in Edgar Bourloton (ed.), Dictionnaire des Parlementaires français (1789–1889) (in French)
- Vassili, Comte Paul (12 January 2016), La Société de Paris: Le Monde politique (in French), Ligaran, ISBN 978-2-335-14572-4
