= Armand Fallières =

President of France from 1906 to 1913

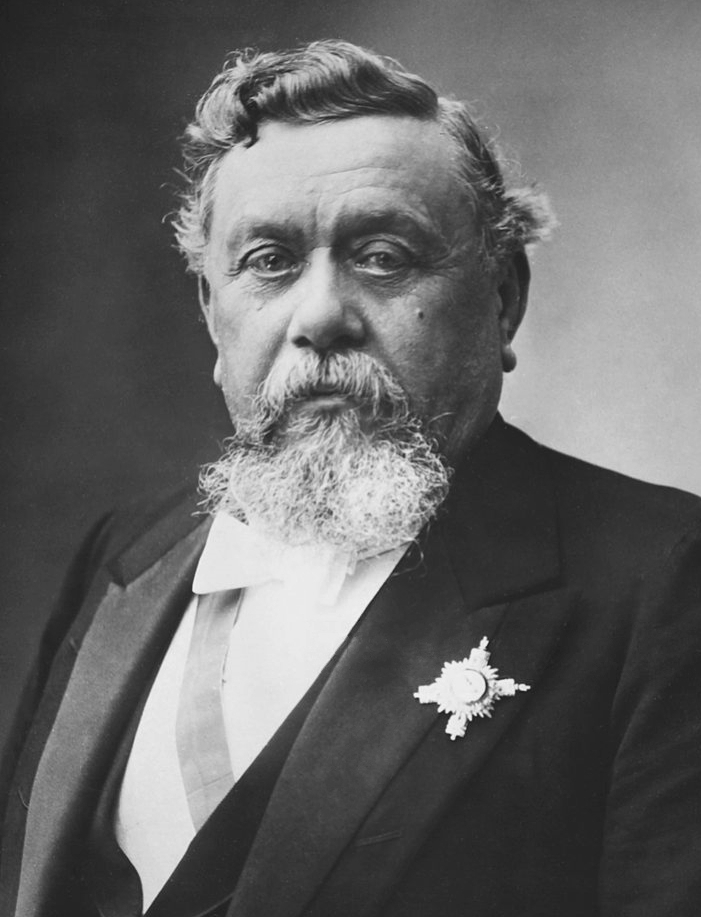
- Fallières in 1906

President of France
- In office 18 February 1906 – 18 February 1913
- Prime Minister: See list: Maurice Rouvier; Ferdinand Sarrien; Georges Clemenceau; Aristide Briand; Ernest Monis; Joseph Caillaux; Raymond Poincaré; Aristide Briand
- Preceded by: Émile Loubet
- Succeeded by: Raymond Poincaré

Prime Minister of France
- In office 29 January 1883 – 21 February 1883
- President: Jules Grévy
- Preceded by: Charles Duclerc
- Succeeded by: Jules Ferry

Personal details
- Born: 6 November 1841 Mézin, France
- Died: 22 June 1931 (aged 89) Lannes, France
- Party: Democratic Republican Alliance
- Education: University of Paris

Clément Armand Fallières (French: [aʁmɑ̃ faljɛʁ]; 6 November 1841 – 22 June 1931) was a French statesman who was President of France from 1906 to 1913.

Clément Armand Fallières was a symbol of republicanism in the French Third Republic. He was born into a middle-class family in Lot-et-Garonne and became a lawyer and a Republican politician. He held various ministerial posts and was briefly prime minister in 1883. He had a moderate and sensitive approach to the religious problem, but was tough in dealing with labor unrest. In 1906, he became president of France, defeating Paul Doumer. According to David Bell, he had a talent for spotting political talent. His presidency was marked by his genial and reassuring manner, making him a popular figurehead. He was content with the procedural honors of a constitutional president and let his ministers make the decisions. His presidency emphasized the Senate's republicanism. He had the power, though not the honour, of presiding over the left-wing governing coalition known as the bloc des gauches ("left bloc").

== Early life ==
He was born at Mézin in the département of Lot-et-Garonne, France, where his father was clerk of the peace. He studied law and became an advocate at Nérac, beginning his public career there as municipal councilor (1868), afterwards mayor (1871), and as councillor-general of the department of Lot-et-Garonne (1871). Being an ardent Republican, he lost this position in May 1873 upon the fall of Thiers, but in February 1876 was elected deputy for Nérac. In the Chamber he sat with the Opportunist Republican parliamentary group, Gauche républicaine, signed the protestation of 18 May 1877, and was re-elected five months later.

In 1880 he became under-secretary of state in the department of the interior in Jules Ferry's ministry (May 1880 to November 1881). From 7 August 1882 to 20 February 1883 he was Minister of the Interior, and for a month (from 29 January 1883) was Prime Minister. His ministry had to face the question of the expulsion of the pretenders to the throne of France, owing to the proclamation by Prince Napoléon (January 1883).

== Political career ==
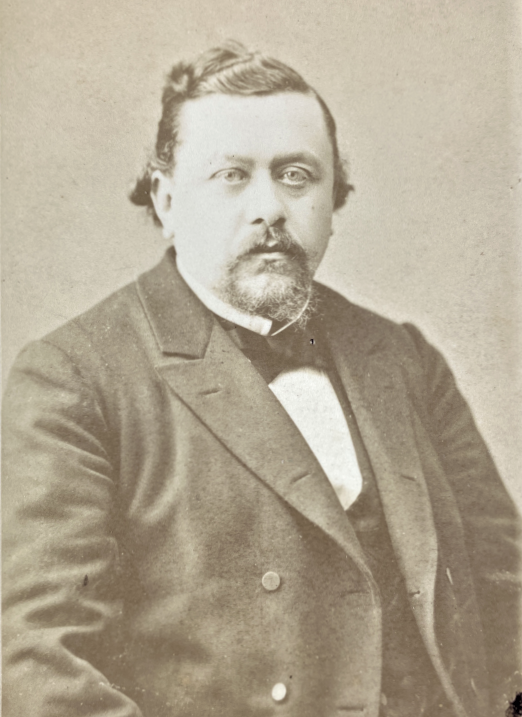
Armand Fallières, c. 1880s

Fallières, who was ill at the time, was not able to face the storm of opposition, and resigned when the Senate rejected his project. The following November, however, he was chosen as minister of public instruction by Jules Ferry, and carried out various reforms in the school system.

He resigned in March 1885, becoming Minister of the Interior in Maurice Rouvier's cabinet two years later. He exchanged his portfolio in December for that of the department of justice. He returned again to the Ministry of the Interior in February 1889, and finally retook the department of justice from March 1890 to February 1892. In June 1890 his département (Lot-et-Garonne) elected him to the senate by 417 votes to 23. There Fallières remained independent of party struggles, although maintaining his influence among the Republicans.

In March 1899 he was elected President of the Senate, and retained that position until January 1906, when he was chosen by a union of the groups of the Left in both chambers as candidate for the Presidency of the Republic. He was elected on the first ballot by 449 votes against 371 for his opponent, Paul Doumer.

Fallières was an outspoken opponent of the death penalty and commuted the sentences of many prisoners sentenced to death.

== Fallières's ministry, 29 January 1883 – 21 February 1883 ==
- Armand Fallières – President of the Council of Ministers, interim Minister of Foreign Affairs, Minister of the Interior, and Minister of Worship
- Jean Thibaudin – Minister of War
- Pierre Tirard – Minister of Finance
- Paul Devès – Minister of Justice
- François de Mahy – Minister of Agriculture and interim Minister of Marine and Colonies
- Jules Duvaux – Minister of Public Instruction and Fine Arts
- Anne Charles Hérisson – Minister of Public Works
- Adolphe Cochery – Minister of Posts and Telegraphs
- Pierre Legrand – Minister of Commerce

== Orders and decorations ==
- Spain: Grand Cross of the Royal and Distinguished Order of Charles III, with Collar, 19 June 1905
- Sweden: Knight of the Royal Order of the Seraphim, 27 April 1906
- Norway: Grand Cross of the Royal Norwegian Order of Saint Olav, with Collar, 13 October 1906
- (Thailand) Siam: Knight of the Order of the Royal House of Chakri, 20 June 1907
- Kingdom of Romania: Collar of the Order of Carol I, 1907
- United Kingdom: Royal Victorian Chain, 29 May 1908
- Kingdom of Italy: Knight of the Supreme Order of the Most Holy Annunciation, 25 April 1909
- Monaco: Grand Cross of the Order of Saint-Charles, 27 April 1909

Political offices
Preceded by René Goblet	Minister of the Interior; 1882–1883	Succeeded by René Waldeck-Rousseau
Preceded by Paul Devès	Minister of Worship; 1882–1883	Succeeded by René Waldeck-Rousseau
Preceded by Charles Duclerc	Prime Minister of France; 1883	Succeeded by Jules Ferry
Preceded by Charles Duclerc	Minister of Foreign Affairs; Acting; 1883	Succeeded by Paul-Armand Challemel-Lacour
Preceded by Jules Ferry	Minister of Public Education and Fine Arts; 1883–1885	Succeeded by René Goblet
Preceded by René Goblet	Minister of the Interior; 1887	Succeeded by Ferdinand Sarrien
Preceded by Charles Mazeau	Minister of Justice; 1887–1888	Succeeded by Jean-Baptiste Ferrouillat
Preceded by François Thévenet	Minister of Worship; 1890–1892	Succeeded by Louis Ricard
Preceded by Édouard Locroy	Minister of Public Education and Fine Arts; 1889–1890	Succeeded by Léon Bourgeois
Preceded by Émile Loubet	President of the Senate; 1899–1906	Succeeded by Antonin Dubost
Preceded by Émile Loubet	President of France; 1906-1913	Succeeded by Raymond Poincaré
