= Sadi Carnot (statesman) =

President of France from 1887 to 1894

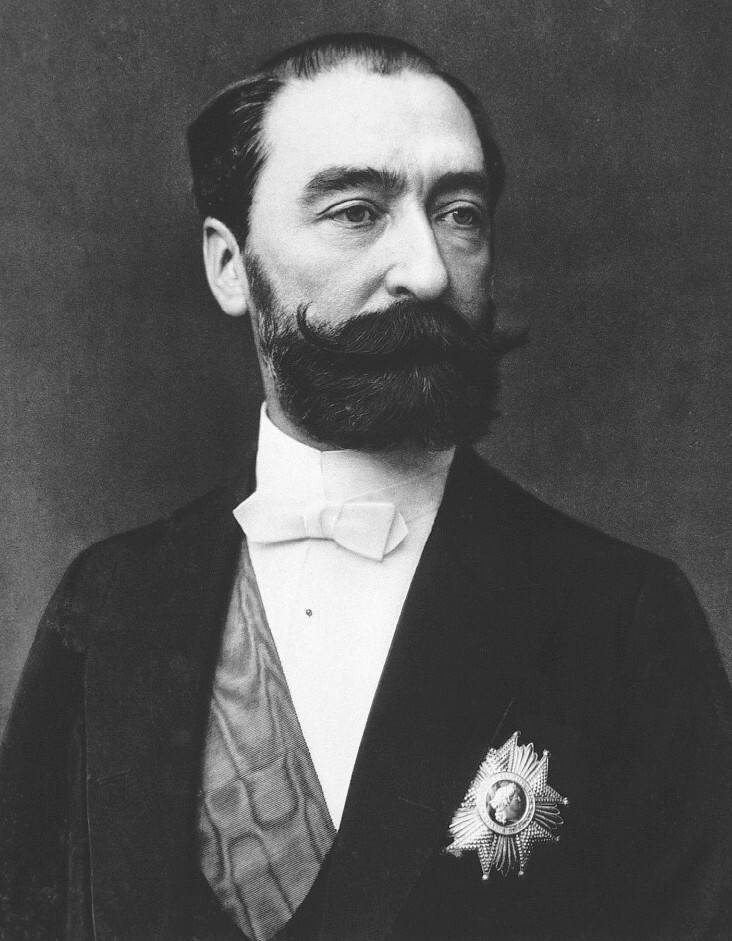
- Official portrait c. 1880s

President of France
- In office 3 December 1887 – 25 June 1894
- Prime Minister: See list: Maurice Rouvier; Pierre Tirard; Charles Floquet; Charles de Freycinet; Émile Loubet; Alexandre Ribot; Charles Dupuy; Jean Casimir-Perier
- Preceded by: Jules Grévy
- Succeeded by: Jean Casimir-Perier

Minister of Finance
- In office 16 April 1885 – 11 December 1886
- Prime Minister: Henri Brisson; Charles de Freycinet
- Preceded by: Jean-Jules Clamageran
- Succeeded by: Albert Dauphin

Minister of Public Works
- In office 6 April 1885 – 16 April 1885
- Prime Minister: Henri Brisson
- Preceded by: David Raynal
- Succeeded by: Charles Demôle
- In office 23 September 1880 – 14 November 1881
- Prime Minister: Jules Ferry
- Preceded by: Henri Varroy
- Succeeded by: David Raynal

Personal details
- Born: 11 August 1837 Limoges, Kingdom of France (under the July Monarchy)
- Died: 25 June 1894 (aged 56) Lyon, French Third Republic
- Cause of death: Assassination
- Party: Moderate Republican

Marie François Sadi Carnot (English: /kɑːrˈnoʊ/ kar-NOH, French: [maʁi fʁɑ̃swa sadi kaʁno]; 11 August 1837 – 25 June 1894), known as Sadi Carnot, was a French statesman who served as President of France from 1887 until his assassination in 1894.

His presidency was marked by a series of poorly handled crises. General Boulanger's rapid rise and failed attempt to march on the Élysée in 1889 posed the first serious threat to the republic during Carnot's term. Then came a series of ministerial crises, financial scandals, labour turmoil, anarchist violence, and finally Carnot's own assassination in 1894. The Panama scandals, involving bribes to parliamentarians, resulted in major financial losses and deeply embarrassed those involved. The extreme right-wing newspaper La Libre Parole, run by antisemitic publicist Édouard Drumont, escalated intolerance towards Third Republic politics.

Carnot presided over a few achievements. He was well received when he travelled around France, inaugurated the 1889 exhibition celebrating the French Revolution, and facilitated a diplomatic rapprochement with Russia. His term in office bolstered the power and influence of the presidency.

== Early life ==
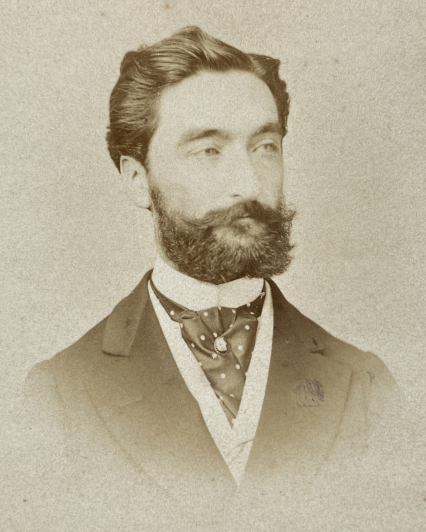
Sadi Carnot, c. 1873

Marie François Sadi Carnot was the son of the statesman Hippolyte Carnot and was born in Limoges, Haute-Vienne. His third given name Sadi was in honour of his uncle Sadi Carnot, the engineer who formulated the second law of thermodynamics and is generally regarded as the founder of the subject, who in turn was named after the Persian poet Sadi of Shiraz. Like his uncle, Marie François came to be known as Sadi Carnot. In his scientific-mindedness and Republican leanings, he resembled his grandfather, Lazare Carnot, the military modernizer and member of both the Committee on Public Safety and the Directory of the French Revolution.

He was educated as a civil engineer and was a highly distinguished student at both the École Polytechnique and the École des Ponts et Chaussées. After his academic course, he obtained an appointment in the public service. His hereditary republicanism caused the Government of National Defense to entrust him in 1870 with the task of organizing resistance in the départements of the Eure, Calvados and Seine-Inférieure, and he was made prefect of Seine-Inférieure in January 1871. In the following month he was elected to the French National Assembly by the département Côte-d'Or. He joined the Opportunist Republican parliamentary group, Gauche républicaine. In August 1878 he was appointed secretary to the minister of public works. He became minister in September 1880 and again in April 1885, moving almost immediately to the ministry of finance, which post he held under both the Ferry and the Freycinet administrations until December 1886.

== Presidency ==
When the Daniel Wilson scandals occasioned the downfall of Jules Grévy in December 1887, Carnot's reputation for integrity made him a candidate for the presidency, and he obtained the support of Georges Clemenceau and many others, so that he was elected by 616 votes out of 827. He assumed office at a critical period, when the republic was all but openly attacked by General Boulanger.

Carnot's ostensible part during this agitation was confined to augmenting his popularity by well-timed appearances on public occasions, which gained credit for the presidency and the republic. When, early in 1889, Boulanger was finally driven into exile, it fell to Carnot to appear as head of the state on two occasions of special interest, the celebration of the centenary of the French Revolution in 1889 and the opening of the Paris Exhibition of the same year. The success of both was regarded as a popular ratification of the republic, and though continually harassed by the formation and dissolution of ephemeral ministries, by socialist outbreaks, and the beginnings of antisemitism, Carnot had only one serious crisis to surmount, the Panama scandals of 1892, which, if they greatly damaged the prestige of the state, increased the respect felt for its head, against whose integrity none could breathe a word.

Carnot was in favour of the Franco-Russian Alliance and received the Order of St Andrew from Alexander III.

== Assassination ==
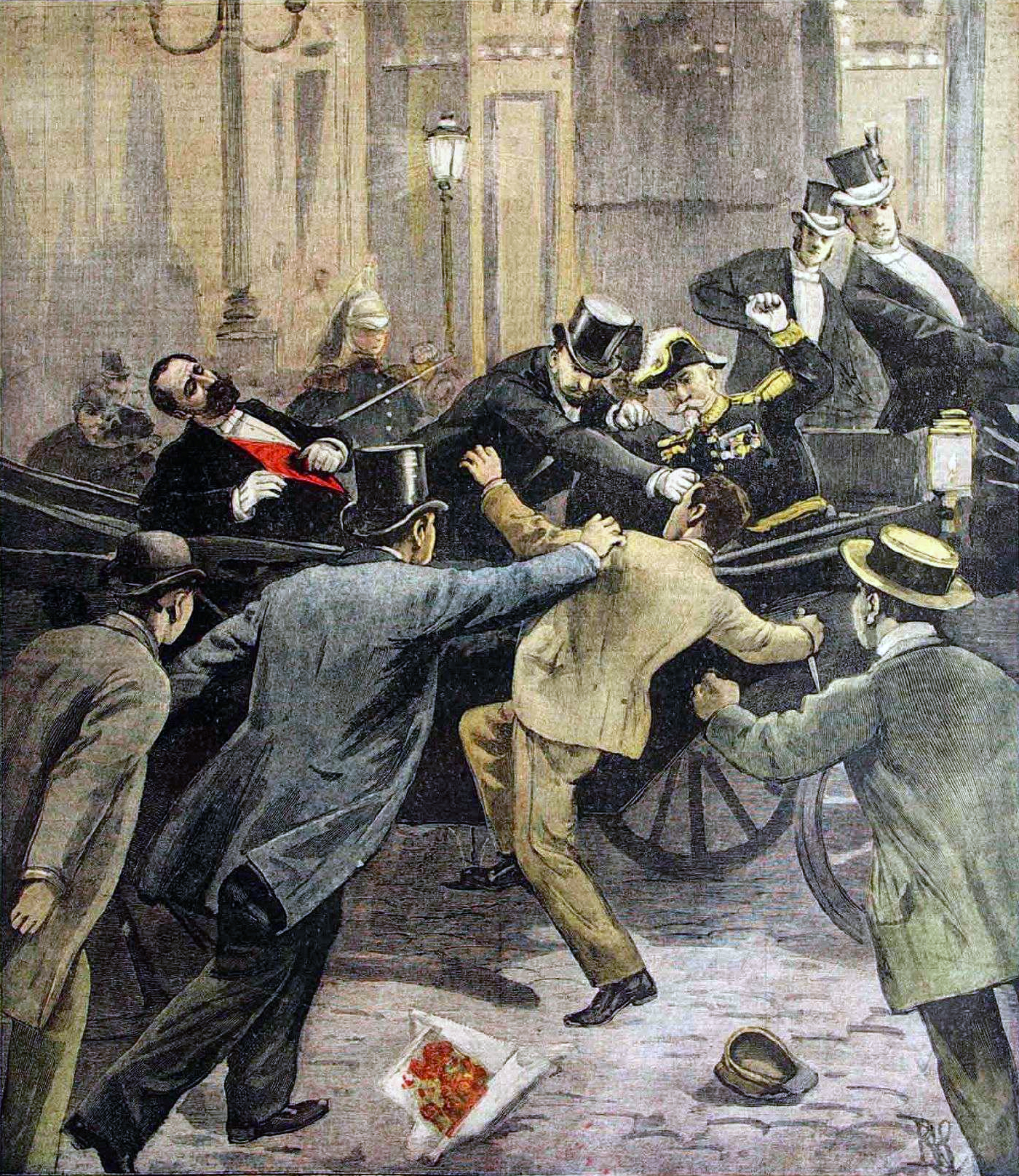
Illustration of Carnot's assassination

President Carnot was reaching the zenith of his popularity, when, on 24 June 1894, after delivering a public banquet speech in Lyon at the Palais du Commerce, in which he appeared to imply that he would not seek re-election, he was stabbed on the Rue de la République by an Italian anarchist named Sante Geronimo Caserio.

Carnot, transported to the Préfecture du Rhône nearby, died shortly after midnight on 25 June, the first president of the republic to die in office. The stabbing aroused widespread horror and grief, and the president was honoured with an elaborate funeral ceremony in the Panthéon on 1 July 1894, after which he was interred in the Panthéon's crypt alongside other notable figures in French history.

Caserio called the assassination a political act, and was convicted and sentenced to death on 3 August 1894 and executed on 16 August 1894.

== See also ==
- Carnot – A city in the Central African Republic named in honour of him
- Politics of France
- André César Vermare – Sculptor of statue in Saint-Chamond

Political offices
Preceded by Henri Varroy	Minister of Public Works; 1880–1881	Succeeded by David Raynal
Preceded by David Raynal	Minister of Public Works; 1885	Succeeded by Charles Demôle
Preceded by Jean-Jules Clamageran	Minister of Finance; 1885–1886	Succeeded by Albert Dauphin
Preceded by Jules Grévy	President of France; 1887–1894	Succeeded by Jean Casimir-Perier
Regnal titles
Preceded by Jules Grévy	Co-Prince of Andorra; 1887–1894; Served alongside: Salvador Casañas y Pagés	Succeeded by Jean Casimir-Perier
