= Jules Grévy =

President of France from 1879 to 1887

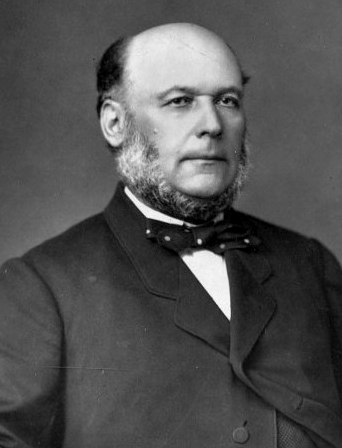
- Grévy c. 1880

President of France
- In office 30 January 1879 – 2 December 1887
- Prime Minister: See list: Jules Armand Dufaure; William Waddington; Charles de Freycinet; Jules Ferry; Léon Gambetta; Charles Duclerc; Armand Fallières; Jules Ferry; Henri Brisson; René Goblet; Maurice Rouvier
- Preceded by: Patrice de MacMahon
- Succeeded by: Sadi Carnot

President of the Chamber of Deputies
- In office 13 March 1876 – 30 January 1879
- Preceded by: Gaston d'Audiffret-Pasquier
- Succeeded by: Léon Gambetta

President of the National Assembly
- In office 16 February 1871 – 2 April 1873
- Preceded by: Eugène Schneider
- Succeeded by: Louis Buffet

Personal details
- Born: 15 August 1807 Mont-sous-Vaudrey, France
- Died: 9 September 1891 (aged 84) Mont-sous-Vaudrey, France
- Party: Moderate Republicans
- Spouse: Coralie Grévy
- Relatives: Albert Grévy (brother)
- Education: University of Paris

François Judith Paul Grévy (15 August 1807 – 9 September 1891), known as Jules Grévy (French: [ʒyl ɡʁevi]), was a French lawyer and politician who served as President of France from 1879 to 1887. He was a leader of the Moderate Republicans, and given that his predecessors were monarchists who tried without success to restore the French monarchy, Grévy is considered the first real republican president of France. During Grévy's presidency from 1879 to 1887, according to David Bell, there was a disunity among his cabinets. Only one survived more than a year. Grévy paid attention chiefly to defense, internal order, and foreign relations. Critics argue that Grévy's confusing approach to appointments set a bad precedent for handling crises.

Born in a small town in the Jura department, Grévy moved to Paris where he initially followed a career in law before becoming a republican activist. He began his political career after the French Revolution of 1848, as a member of the National Assembly of the French Second Republic, where he became known for his opposition to Louis-Napoléon Bonaparte and as a supporter of lesser authority for the executive branch. During the 1851 coup d'état by Louis-Napoléon he was briefly imprisoned, and afterwards retired from political life.

With the downfall of the Second French Empire and the reestablishment of the Republic in 1870, Grévy returned to prominence in national politics. After occupying high offices in the National Assembly and the Chamber of Deputies, he was elected president of France in 1879. During his presidency Grévy confirmed his longtime stance by diminishing his own executive authority in favor of the Parliament, and in foreign policy strove for peaceful relations and opposed colonialism. He was reelected in 1885, but two years later Grévy's son-in-law was implicated in a corruption scandal and Grévy had to resign after exhausting the pool of willing politicians to form a fresh government. His nearly nine years as president of France are seen as the consolidation of the French Third Republic.

== Early life and career ==
Grévy was born on 15 August 1807 in Mont-sous-Vaudrey, in the department of Jura, into a republican family. His paternal grandfather, Nicolas Grévy (1736–1812), the son of farmers from Aumont, moved to Mont-sous-Vaudrey during the French Revolution, where he bought the property of la Grangerie. He was a justice of the peace. Grévy's parents were François Hyacinthe Grevy (1773–1857) and Jeanne Gabrielle Planet (1782–1855). His father, who had joined the French Revolutionary Army as a volunteer in 1792, rose to become a battalion commander and fought in the Revolutionary Wars until retiring to Mont-sous-Vaudrey under the Consulate. He operated a tile factory on his property.

At age 10, Grévy started attending school at the nearby town of Poligny, and continued his studies in Besançon, Dole, and finally at the Faculty of Law of Paris. He became a lawyer at the Paris bar in 1837, distinguishing himself at the Conférence du barreau de Paris. Having steadily maintained republican principles under the July Monarchy, he started his political activity as a defense attorney in the trial of Philippet and Quignot, two accomplies of Armand Barbès in a failed republican insurrection on 12 May 1839.

== Second Republic ==
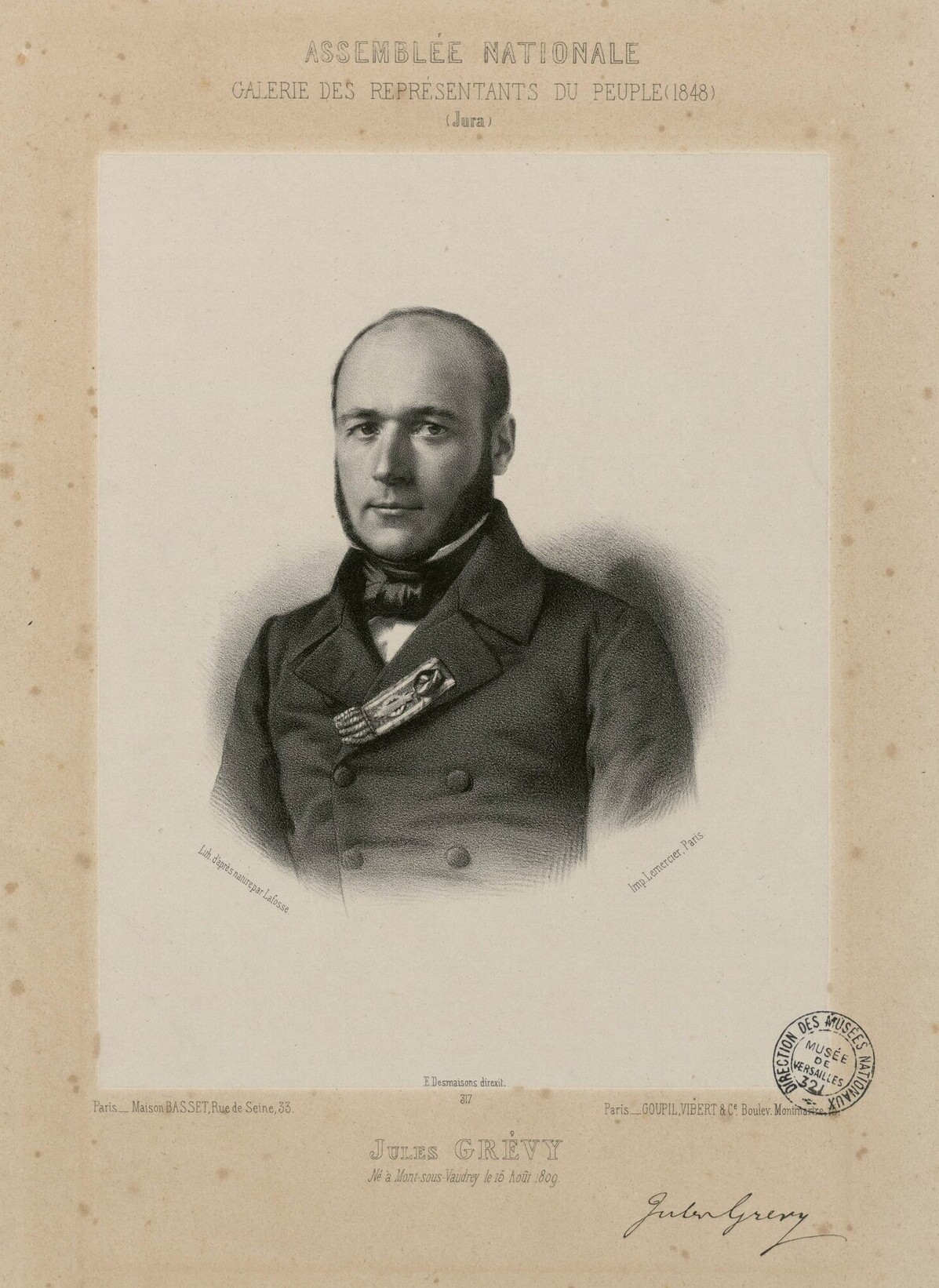
Grévy as a deputy in the National Assembly, 1848

In 1848, a revolution in France abolished the July Monarchy and led to the creation of the Second Republic, and with it Grévy was appointed Commissioner of the Republic for the department of Jura. In April 1848 he was elected by that department for a seat in the constituent National Assembly. On the signed declaration for his candidacy, Grévy demanded a "strong and liberal Republic, that makes itself loved for its wisdom and moderation". Foreseeing the rise of Louis-Napoléon Bonaparte in that year's presidential election he began to advocate a weak executive branch, and became famous during the debates on the drafting of the Constitution for his opposition to electing the president by universal suffrage, instead proposing that the executive power should be vested on a "President of the Council of Ministers", who would be appointed and dismissed by the directly elected National Assembly. The "Grévy Amendment", as it became known, was rejected, and in December 1848 Bonaparte was elected president of France.

Grévy was elected vice-president of the National Assembly in April 1849. The same month he protested against the president's decision to launch an expedition against the revolutionary Roman Republic, created as part of the First Italian War of Independence, but the invasion proceeded and succeeded in restoring Papal rule. In 1851, his fear that Louis-Napoléon intended to perpetuate himself in power was proven true, when the president seized dictatorial power with a coup d'état on 2 December, in which Grévy was arrested and imprisoned in Mazas Prison. He was released shortly after but retired from politics in the subsequent French Empire, under now emperor Napoleon III, and returned to his law practice.

== Third Republic ==
Grévy resumed his political career in the last years of the Empire. In 1868 he was elected to the Corps législatif, where he quickly emerged as a leader of the liberal opposition. Along with Adolphe Thiers and Léon Gambetta he opposed the declaration of the Franco-Prussian War, in 1870, and condemned the socialist insurrection of the Paris Commune. Upon the death of Thiers years later, in 1877, Grévy would become the head of the Republican Party.

After the collapse of the Empire in the Franco-Prussian War, Grévy was elected as representative of Jura and Bouches-du-Rhône to the National Assembly of the new Third Republic, in 1871. He served as president of the Assembly from February 1871 to April 1873, when he resigned on account of the opposition from the Right, which blamed him for having called one of its members to order in the session of the previous day. On 8 March 1876 Grévy was named president of the Chamber of Deputies, a post which he filled with such efficiency that upon the resignation of Legitimist president Marshal de MacMahon he seemed to step naturally into the Presidency of the Republic, and on 30 January 1879 was elected without opposition by the republican parties.

== Presidency ==
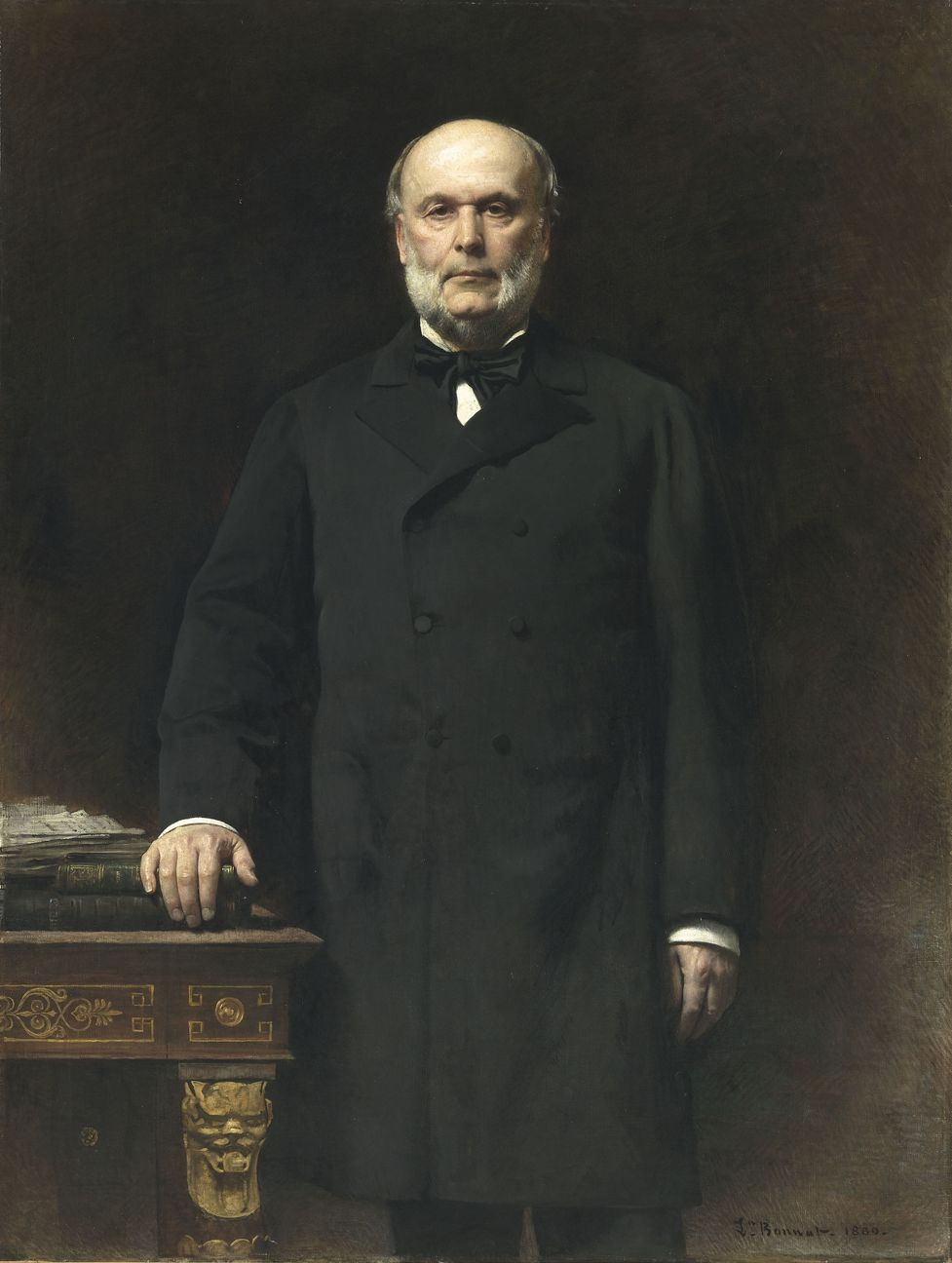
Grévy by Léon Bonnat, 1880

Throughout his presidency, Grévy sought to minimize his powers and instead favored a strong legislature. On 6 February 1879, shortly after taking office, he made a speech before the Chambers where he explained his vision of the role of President: "Subject with sincerity to the great law of the parliamentary regime, I will never enter into battle against national wishes expressed by its institutional bodies". This interpretation of the office's limited power influenced most of the later presidents of the Third Republic.

In foreign policy he strove for peaceful relations, particularly with the German Empire, resisting revanchist demands for a retribution over the disastrous defeat in the Franco-Prussian War, and opposed colonial expansion. Among internal policies his presidency was marked by anti-clerical reforms, particularly under the government of prime minister Charles de Freycinet. In 1880, he passed an amnesty law in favor of the communards.

On 28 December 1885, Grévy was elected for another seven years as president of the Republic. Two years later however, in December 1887, he was compelled to resign due to the decorations scandal that started after his son-in-law, Daniel Wilson, was found to be selling awards of the Legion of Honour. Although Grévy himself was not implicated in the scheme, he was indirectly responsible for the misuse Wilson had made of the access to the Élysée. Under pressure from the Chamber of Deputies and the Senate, Grévy resigned on 2 December and addressed a last message to the two chambers, in which he stated "my duty and my right would be to resist, wisdom and patriotism command me to yield". This political matter was the first to feed anti-Masonic opinion in France.

Grévy wrote a two-volume Discours politiques et judiciaires ("Political and Judicial Speeches") in 1888.

== Personal life ==
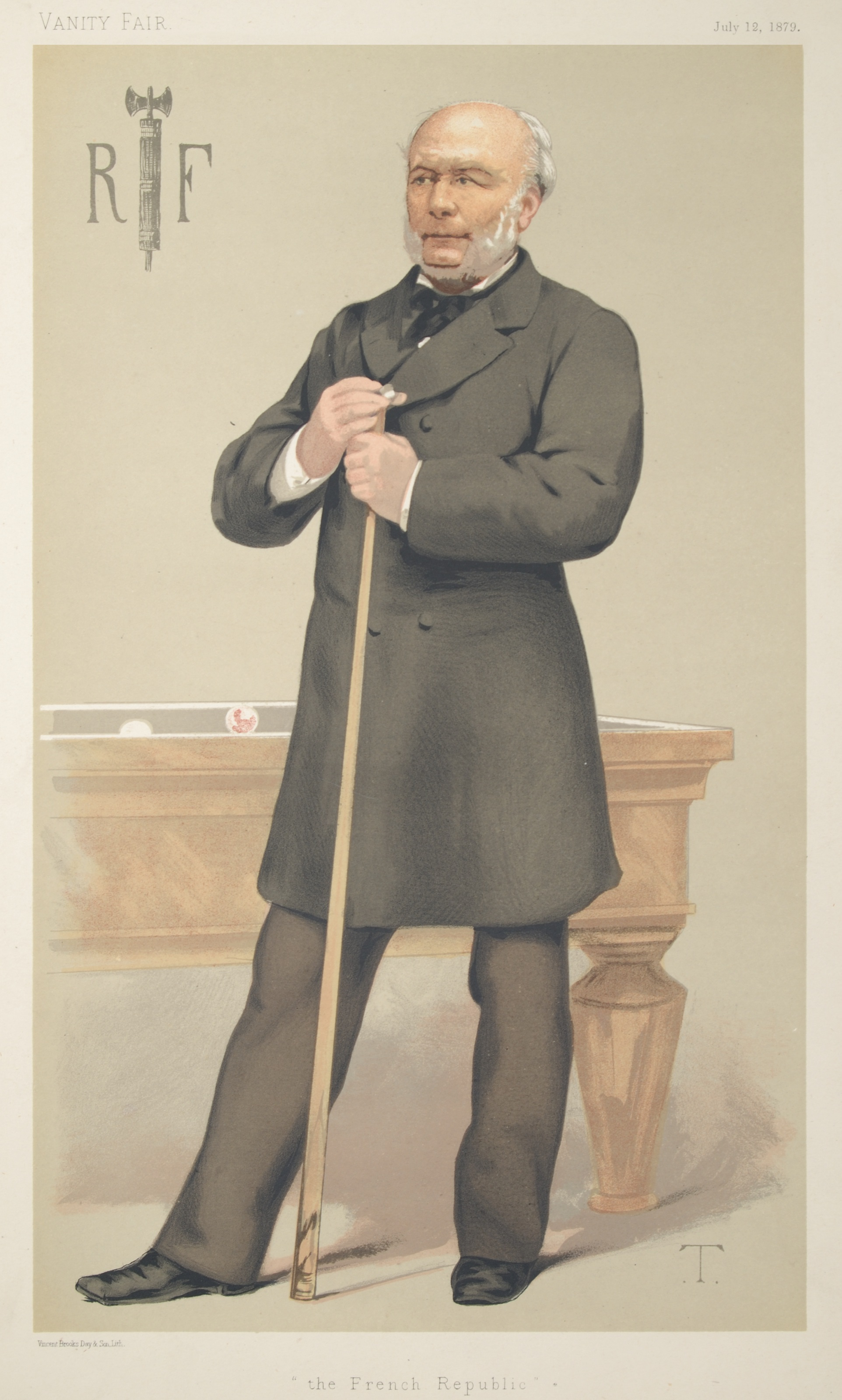
Portrait of Grévy as a billiards player from the 12 July 1879 issue of Vanity Fair, by Théobald Chartran

Grévy married in 1848 to Coralie Frassie, the daughter of a tanner from Narbonne. They had one daughter, Alice (1849–1938), who married Daniel Wilson in 1881.

He died in his hometown of Mont-sous-Vaudrey on 9 September 1891, following a pulmonary edema. His state funeral was held on 14 September.

Initiated at the masonic lodge "La Constante Amitié" in Arras, his masonic activity was inseparable from his policies, especially in the ensuing struggle for separation of church and state that marked the beginning of the Third Republic and MacMahon's resignation.

In private life, Grévy was an ardent billiards player, and was featured as one in a portrait published in the Vanity Fair magazine in 1879.

He is referred to as one of Swann's dinner hosts in Proust's In Search of Lost Time.

There is a type of lilac, Syringa vulgaris 'President Grévy', named after him.

Grévy's zebra is named after him.

Political offices
Preceded by Eugène Schneider as President of the Corps législatif	President of the National Assembly; 1876–1879	Succeeded by Louis Buffet
Preceded by Gaston Audiffret-Pasquier as President of the National Assembly	President of the Chamber of Deputies; 1879–1887	Succeeded by Léon Gambetta
Preceded by Patrice de MacMahon	President of France; 1879–1887	Succeeded by Sadi Carnot
Regnal titles
Preceded by Patrice de MacMahon	Co-Prince of Andorra; 1879–1887; Served alongside: Salvador Casañas y Pagés	Succeeded by Sadi Carnot
