= Charles Duclerc =

French journalist and politician

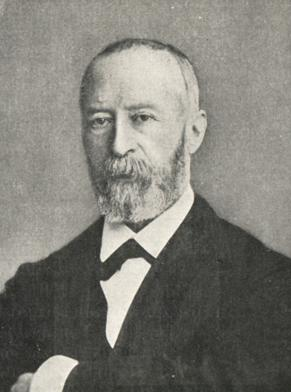

Prime Minister of France
- In office 7 August 1882 – 29 January 1883
- President: Jules Grévy
- Preceded by: Charles de Freycinet
- Succeeded by: Armand Fallières

Personal details
- Born: 9 November 1812
- Died: 21 July 1888 (aged 75)
- Party: Opportunist Republicans

Charles Théodore Eugène Duclerc (French: [ʃaʁl dyklɛʁ]; 7 August 1812, Bagnères-de-Bigorre – 29 January 1888) was a French journalist and politician of the Third Republic. He was a member of the editorial board of the National newspaper. Duclerc served as Minister of Finance from 7 March to 9 May 1848 in the provisional government of France headed by Jacques-Charles Dupont de l'Eure. He later served for six months as prime minister, from 1882 to 1883 under the third Republic.

Duclerc was born in Bagnères-de-Bigorre and he died in Paris.

== Duclerc's Ministry, 7 August 1882 – 29 January 1883 ==
- Charles Duclerc – President of the Council and Minister of Foreign Affairs
- Jean-Baptiste Billot – Minister of War
- Armand Fallières – Minister of the Interior
- Pierre Tirard – Minister of Finance
- Paul Devès – Minister of Justice and Worship
- Jean Bernard Jauréguiberry – Minister of Marine and Colonies
- Jules Duvaux – Minister of Public Instruction and Fine Arts
- François de Mahy – Minister of Agriculture
- Anne Charles Hérisson – Minister of Public Works
- Adolphe Cochery – Minister of Posts and Telegraphs
- Pierre Legrand – Minister of Commerce

Changes

- 13 September 1882 – Armand Fallières succeeds Devès as Minister of Worship. Fallières remains Interior Minister, and Devès Minister of Justice.

Political offices
Preceded by Charles de Freycinet	Prime Minister of France; 1882–1883	Succeeded by Armand Fallières
Preceded by Charles de Freycinet	Minister of Foreign Affairs; 1882–1883	Succeeded by Armand Fallières
