= Louis Tirman =

French lawyer and civil servant

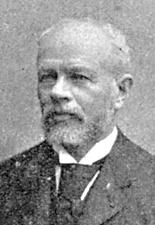

Governor General of Algeria
- In office 26 November 1881 – 18 April 1891
- Preceded by: Albert Grévy
- Succeeded by: Jules Cambon

Senator of Ardennes
- In office 18 December 1892 – 2 August 1899
- Preceded by: Louis Eugène Péronne
- Succeeded by: Eugène Fagot

Personal details
- Born: 29 July 1837 Mézières, Ardennes, France
- Died: 2 August 1899 (aged 62) La Ferté-Loupière, Yonne, France

Louis Tirman (29 July 1837 – 2 August 1899) was a French lawyer and civil servant who was prefect of several departments, Governor General of French Algeria from 1881 to 1891 and then Senator of Ardennes from 1892 until his death in 1899. He believed in consolidating the French presence in Algeria through support of the colons (French settlers), and the grant of French nationality to the Algerian-born children of Spanish and Italian settlers.

== Life ==
=== Family ===
Louis Tirman was born on 29 July 1837 in Mézières, Ardennes. He came from a prosperous bourgeois Mézières family. His family was Catholic, with liberal traditions. His father was Julien-Victor-Albert Tirman (1800–1862), a doctor and politician, member of the Higher Committee of Public Instruction and the Board of Administration of the Hospice de Mézières. His father was a municipal councilor in Mézières and general councilor for the Mézières from 1853 to 1862. His mother was Charlotte-Victorine Regnault (1812–1844), daughter of a businessman and industrialist from Charleville.

Tirman's maternal uncle Antoine Regnault was a militant republican. His cousin Jules Riché^{(fr)} was a Bonapartist deputy from 1852 to 1860, then a member of the Council of State until the end of the Second Empire. The painter Henriette Tirman (1875–1952) was the daughter of his brother, doctor Charles-Louis-Henry Tirman. On 22 September 1863 he married Marie-Eugénie Donckier de Donceel (1839–1917) in Philippeville, Belgium. She brought a large dowry. They had a daughter, Louise (1864–1955). Through inheritance and his salary Firman became a wealthy man in his own right.

=== Lawyer and administrator (1859–81) ===
After his secondary education in Mézières and Paris Tirman entered the Faculty of Law in Paris, where he was a friend of Léon Gambetta. He obtained his license as a lawyer on 12 November 1859 and his doctorate in law in 1862. He became an advocate in Paris. On 16 August 1863 he was appointed counselor to the Prefecture of Ardennes. On 20 February 1869 Tirman was appointed counselor to the Prefecture of Seine-et-Marne.

On 17 March 1870 Tirman was appointed secretary-general to the prefecture of Ardennes. During the Franco-Prussian War of 1870, after the fall of the Second French Empire Gambetta named him Prefect of Ardennes on 10 September 1870. Tirman was appointed to replace the prefect, Foy, and was responsible for organizing the defense and administration of the department. The Ardennes were soon fully occupied, but Tirman managed to deploy some troops who put up a courageous resistance. Firman took refuge in Givet. On 25 October 1870 he resumed his position as Secretary General of the Prefecture of Ardennes.

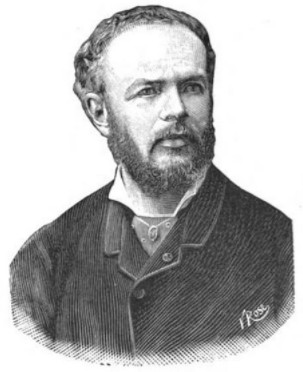
Tirman as Prefect of Puy de Dôme, c. 1876

After the Armistice, Adolphe Thiers appointed Tirman Prefect of Ardennes on 6 April 1871. This was a delicate position since the Prussians remained until 1873. He left office on 24 May 1873. On 21 March 1876 he was appointed Prefect of Puy de Dôme, holding office until 16 May 1877. On 29 December 1877 he was appointed Prefect of Bouches-du-Rhône. In 1879 he was appointed to the Council of State.

=== Governor General of Algeria (1881–91) ===
Tirman was appointed Governor-General of Algeria on 26 November 1881. At this time Algeria was considered a detached part of France rather than a colony, and was administered by a civilian governor. Gambetta appointed Tirman to replace Albert Grévy. On several occasions over the next ten years Tirman addressed the Senate or Chamber of Deputies during debates about Algeria. His achievements in Algeria included creation of many centers of French colonization, construction of roads and railways, houses and schools. The Crémieux Decree of 1870 had granted French citizenship to the Algerian Jews. Tirman and the Minister of Justice Paul Devès yielded to antisemitic factions in Algeria and France and resisted extending this decree to cover the protectorate of the M'zab to the south of the original departments of Algeria. In 1884 Tirman reasserted that despite the annexation of the M'zab in 1882, the agreement of 1853 that granted internal autonomy remained in force.

At this time the population of foreigners such as Spanish and Italians in Algeria was growing, and would soon exceed that of French. Tirman observed that "Since we no longer have the hope of increasing the French population by means of official colonization, we must seek the remedy in the naturalization of foreigners." On 30 September 1884 Tirman submitted a draft law to the government developed by the Algiers School of Law that proposed to confer French citizenship on any individual born in the colony to foreign parents unless they decided to retain their parent's nationality in the year after obtaining their majority. However, the government rejected a provision that would have guaranteed the jus soli. On 23 May 1885 Tirman made another attempt, proposing a special law for Algeria, but this was also rejected. It was not until 1889 that a law was adopted giving the right of citizenship to children of foreigners, causing an immediate increase in the number of French citizens in Algeria.

By 1891 there was growing hostility to Tirman in the Senate for what was called by one senator an "anti-Arabic policy". Tirman was said to have become a tool of the colons (French settlers). While the colons paid no land taxes, he had dispossessed the indigenous people and harassed them with taxes, and had done nothing to assimilate them to France, including schooling their children. His proposal to let Algeria become financially autonomous led to his dismissal. In April 1891 Tirman was replaced by Jules Cambon and returned to France. He was named to the Ardennes General Council for the canton of Attigny after his return in 1891. Alexandre Isaac issued a report on 15 March 1898 in which he asked the Algerian committee to end the system of attachment that Albert Grévy^{(fr)} had started in 1881, and that had been expanded by Louis Tirman between then and 1891.

=== Senator (1892–99) ===
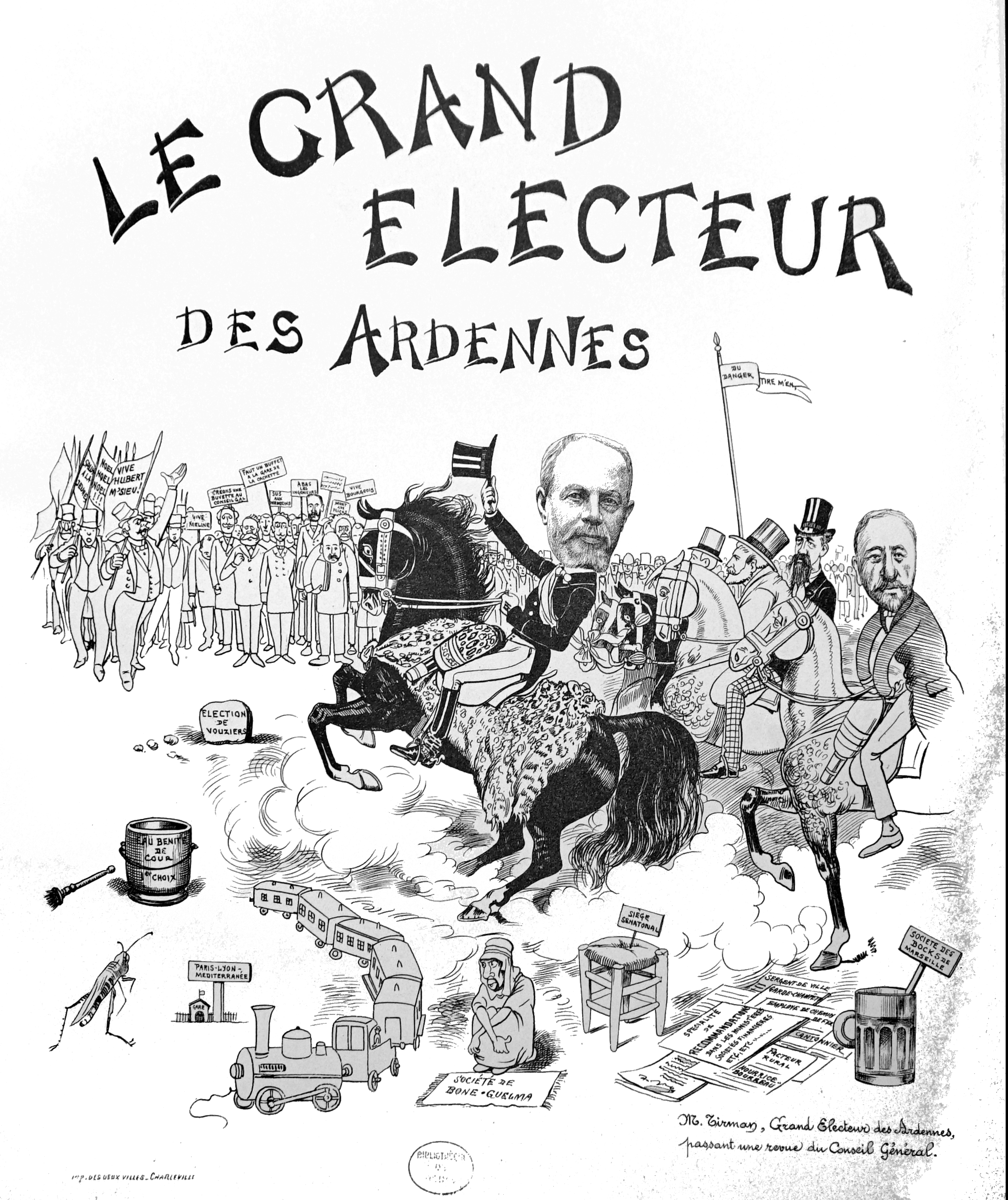
1898 cartoon of Tirman from La vie ardennaise illustrée

On 18 December 1892 Tirman was elected Senator of Ardennes in place of Louis Eugène Péronne, who had died. He won in the first round with 478 votes out of 856. He was reelected on 7 January 1894, again in the first round, by 652 votes out of 851. He sat with the Republican Left group. Tirmin was a member of the Colonial group in the Senate. He remained interested in everything to do with Algeria. He was active in the discussion of the report presented by Émile Combes on behalf of the commission to examine legal and administrative changes related to Muslim higher education, and in the debate over Algerian land ownership.

Tirman was President of the Ardennes General Council from 1893 to 1898. In 1896 he was named chairman of the board of directors of the Chemins de fer de Paris à Lyon et à la Méditerranée (PLM), a railway company. Louis Tirman died in office at the age of 62 on 2 August 1899 at the Château des Taboureaux near La Ferté-Loupière, Yonne. He had been made Officer of the Legion of Honour on 29 December 1881, Commander on 9 July 1883, Grand Officer on 20 July 1885 and Grand-Croix on 28 April 1891. Tirman was also awarded the Grand-croix of the Ordre du Nichan El-Anouar, Grand Cross of the Order of the Polar Star of Sweden and Grand Cross of the Order of Saint Stanislaus of Russia.

== Publications ==
Publications by Tirman included:

- Tirman, Louis (1859), Des actes de l'état civil (Th. licence : Droit), Paris: C. de Mourgues, p. 54
- Tirman, Louis (1871), Rapport du préfet au conseil général du département des Ardennes. Session de 1871, Mézières
- Tirman, Louis (1895), Rapport fait au nom de la commission chargée d'examiner le projet de loi élevant de dix-huit à dix-neuf le nombre des conseillers d'Etat en service extraordinaire (Sénat, session 1895, n ° 24), Paris: Impr. de P. Mouillot / France. Sénat

== Sources ==
- Belmessous, Saliha (2013-03-21), Assimilation and Empire: Uniformity in French and British Colonies, 1541-1954, OUP Oxford, ISBN 978-0-19-165102-1
- Bonnefoy, Georges (1895), Histoire de l'administration civile dans la province d'Auvergne et le département du Puy-de-Dôme: depuis les temps les plus reculés jusqu'à nos jours (in French), E. Lechevalier
- III – Louis Tirman (in French), Conseil Départemental des Ardennes, 11 September 2007
- Jolly, Jean, ed. (1960), "TIRMAN (Louis)", Dictionnaire des parlementaires français de 1889 à 1940, Presses universitaires de France
- Jolly, Jean, ed. (1960b), "ISAAC (PIERRE, Alexandre, Ildefonse)", Dictionnaire des parlementaires français de 1889 à 1940, Presses universitaires de France
- Lagana, Marc (1990), Le Parti Colonial Français: Éléments d'Histoire (in French), PUQ, ISBN 978-2-7605-2304-3
- Louis Tirman (1837-1899) (in French), BnF: Bibliotheque nationale de France
- Martin, Frederick; Keltie, Sir John Scott; Renwick, Isaac Parker Anderson; Epstein, Mortimer (1891), The Statesman's Year-book, MacMillan Press Limited
- Ph.M, "Louis Tirman gouverneur général de l'Algérie en 1881 pendant 11 ans", L'Union (in French)
- Stein, Sarah Abrevaya (2014-05-06), Saharan Jews and the Fate of French Algeria, University of Chicago Press, ISBN 978-0-226-12388-2
- Weil, Patrick (2005), "Le statut des musulmans en Algérie coloniale : Une nationalité française dénaturée", Histoire de la justice (in French), Association française pour l'histoire de la Justice, doi:10.3917/rhj.016.0093, ISBN 2110056932
- Weil, Patrick (2010-07-01), How to Be French: Nationality in the Making since 1789, Duke University Press, ISBN 978-0-8223-8947-7
- Wright, Vincent; Anceau, Éric (2007), "TIRMAN (Louis)", Les préfets de Gambetta (in French), Presses Paris Sorbonne, ISBN 978-2-84050-504-4
