= Jules Ferry =

French Prime Minister in the 1800s

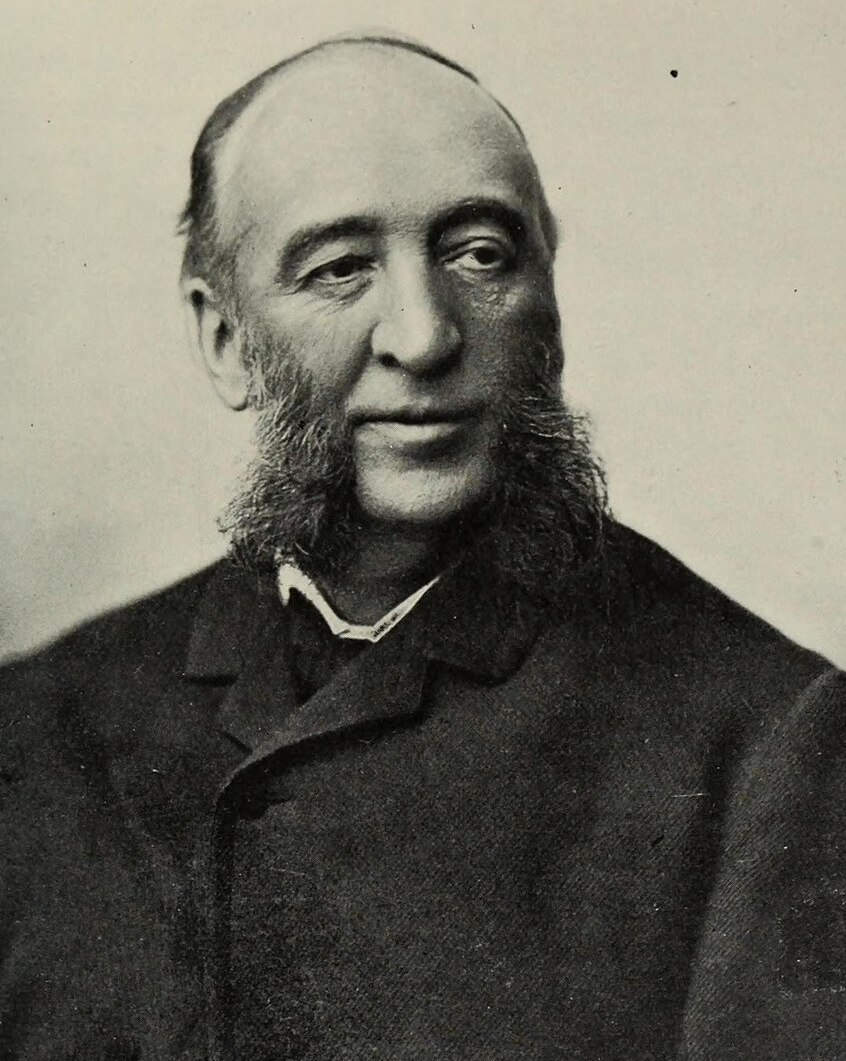

Prime Minister of France
- In office 21 February 1883 – 30 March 1885
- President: Jules Grévy
- Preceded by: Armand Fallières
- Succeeded by: Henri Brisson
- In office 23 September 1880 – 10 November 1881
- President: Jules Grévy
- Preceded by: Charles de Freycinet
- Succeeded by: Léon Gambetta

President of the French Senate
- In office 24 February 1893 – 17 March 1893
- Preceded by: Philippe Le Royer
- Succeeded by: Paul-Armand Challemel-Lacour

Minister of Public Education and Fine Arts
- In office 21 February 1883 – 20 November 1883
- Prime Minister: Himself
- Preceded by: Jules Duvaux
- Succeeded by: Armand Fallières
- In office 30 January 1882 – 29 July 1882
- Prime Minister: Charles de Freycinet
- Preceded by: Paul Bert
- Succeeded by: Jules Duvaux
- In office 4 February 1879 – 10 November 1881
- Prime Minister: William Waddington; Charles de Freycinet; Himself
- Preceded by: Agénor Bardoux
- Succeeded by: Paul Bert

Member of the French Chamber of Deputies for Vosges
- In office 8 February 1871 – 6 October 1889
- Preceded by: Louis Buffet
- Succeeded by: Ernest Picot

10th Mayor of Paris
- In office 15 November 1870 – 5 June 1871
- Preceded by: Étienne Arago
- Succeeded by: Office abolished Jacques Chirac (1977)

Member of the French Legislative Body for Seine
- In office 8 June 1869 – 8 February 1871
- Preceded by: Émile Ollivier
- Succeeded by: Charles Floquet

Personal details
- Born: Jules François Camille Ferry; 5 April 1832 Saint-Dié-des-Vosges, Vosges, Kingdom of France
- Died: 17 March 1893 (aged 60) Paris, Seine, French Republic
- Party: "Close" Republicans (1869–1871); Moderate Republicans (1871–1888); National Republican Association (1888–1893)
- Spouse: Eugénie Risler (m. 1875) (1850–1920)
- Profession: Journalist, lawyer

Jules François Camille Ferry (French: [ʒyl fɛʁi]; 5 April 1832 – 17 March 1893) was a French statesman and republican philosopher. He was one of the leaders of the Moderate Republicans and served as Prime Minister of France from 1880 to 1881 and 1883 to 1885. He was a promoter of laicism and colonial expansion. Under the Third Republic, Ferry made primary education free and compulsory through several new laws. However, he was forced to resign following the Sino-French War in 1885 due to his unpopularity and public opinion against the war.

== Biography ==
=== Early life and family ===
Ferry was born in France, in the Vosges department, to Charles-Édouard Ferry, a lawyer from a family that had established itself in Saint-Dié as bellmakers, and Adélaïde Jamelet. His paternal grandfather, François-Joseph Ferry, was mayor of Saint-Dié through the Consulate and the First Empire. He studied law, and was called to the bar at Paris in 1854, but soon went into politics, contributing to various newspapers, particularly to Le Temps. He attacked the Second French Empire with great violence, directing his opposition especially against Baron Haussmann, prefect of the Seine department. A series of his articles in Le Temps was later republished as The Fantastic Tales of Haussmann (1868).

=== Political rise ===
Elected republican deputy for Paris in 1869, he protested against the declaration of war with Germany, and on 6 September 1870 was appointed prefect of the Seine by the Government of National Defence.

In this position, he had the difficult task of administering Paris during the siege, and after the Paris Commune was obliged to resign (5 June 1871). From 1872 to 1873, he was sent by Adolphe Thiers as minister to Athens, but returned to the chamber as deputy for the Vosges, and became one of the leaders of the Opportunist Republicans. When the first republican ministry was formed under W. H. Waddington on 4 February 1879, he was one of its members, and continued in the ministry until 30 March 1885, except for two short interruptions (from 10 November 1881 to 30 January 1882, and from 29 July 1882 to 21 February 1883), first as minister of education and then as minister of foreign affairs. A leader of the Opportunist Republicans faction, he was twice premier (1880–1881 and 1883–1885). He was an active Freemason initiated on 8 July 1875, in "La Clémente Amitiée" lodge in Paris, the same day as Émile Littré. He became a member of the "Alsace-Lorraine" Lodge founded in Paris in 1782.

=== School reforms ===
Two important works are associated with his administration: the non-clerical organization of public education, and the major colonial expansion of France.

Ferry believed the path to a modernized and prosperous France lay in the triumph of reason over religion. School reforms were a key part of his plan.

Following the republican program, he proposed to destroy the influence of the clergy in universities and founded his own system of republican schooling. He reorganized the committee of public education (law of 27 February 1880) and proposed a regulation for the conferring of university degrees, which, though rejected, aroused violent polemics because the 7th article took away from the unauthorized religious orders the right to teach. He finally succeeded in passing his eponymous laws of 16 June 1881 and 28 March 1882, which made primary education in France free, non-clerical (laïque) and mandatory. In higher education, the number of professors called the "Republic's black hussars" (French: hussards noirs de la République) because of their Republican support, doubled under his ministry.

=== Other measures ===
The Finance Law of 30 January 1884 granted a national pension fund greater autonomy and, as noted by one study, "simplified its management, tasking it with providing for the payment of life annuities itself. The government wanted the Fund to henceforth balance its operations and no longer generate a deficit for the State."

=== Colonial expansion ===
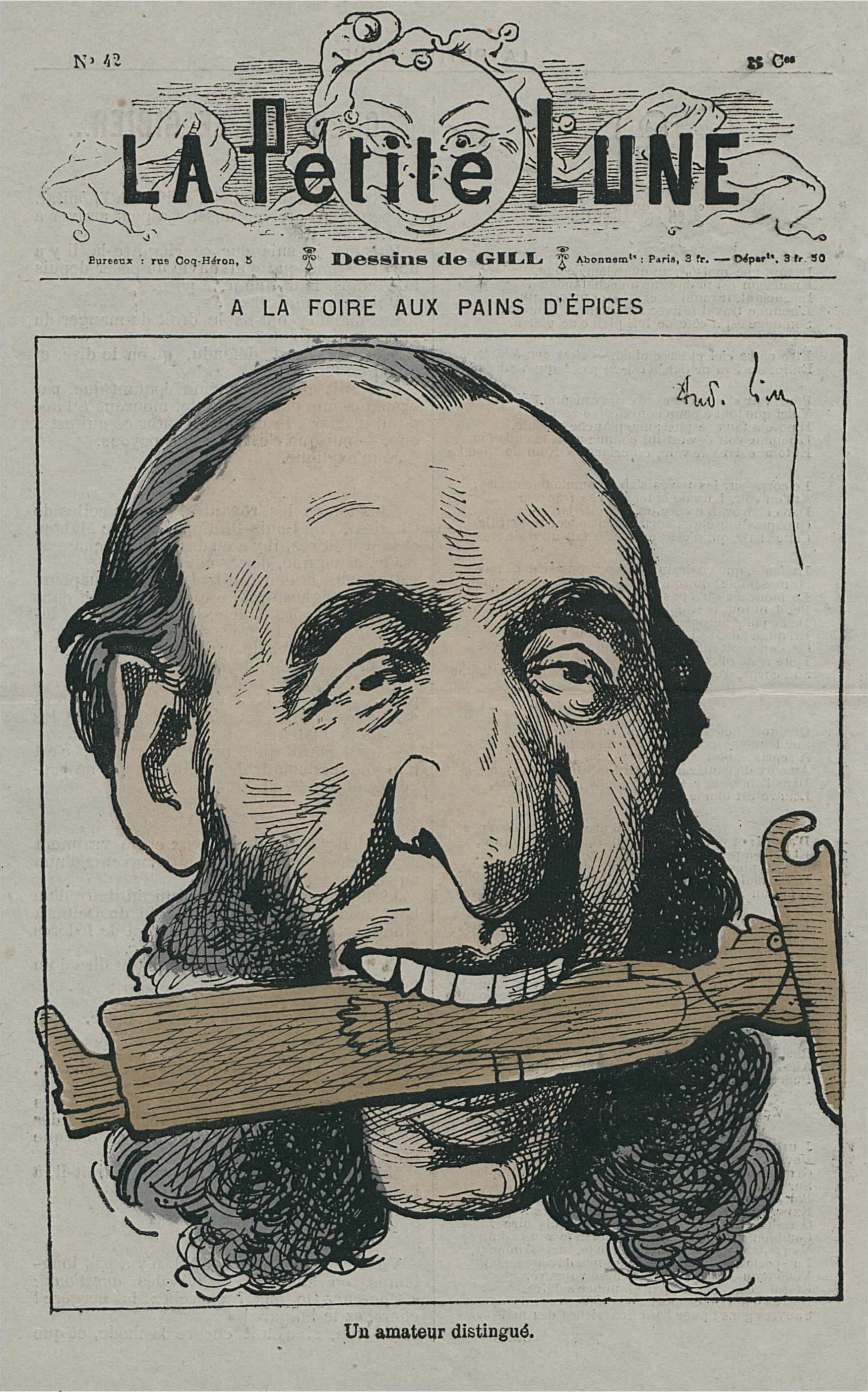
André Gill's cartoon on Ferry, where he eats a gingerbread priest (1878)

After the military defeat of France by Prussia in 1870, Ferry formed the idea of acquiring a great colonial empire, principally for the sake of economic exploitation. In 1882, as minister of public instruction, he decided to create a mission to explore the Regency of Tunisia. The expedition was headed by the botanist Ernest Cosson and included the botanist Napoléon Doumet-Adanson and other naturalists. In 1884, a geological section under Georges Rolland was added to the Tunisian Scientific Exploration Mission. Rolland was assisted by Philippe Thomas from 1885 and by Georges Le Mesle in 1887.

In a speech on the colonial empire before the Chamber of Deputies on 28 March 1884, he declared that "it is a right for the superior races, because they have a duty. They have the duty to civilize the inferior races." Ferry directed the negotiations which led to the establishment of a French protectorate in Tunis (1881), prepared the treaty of 17 December 1885 for the occupation of Madagascar; directed the exploration of the Congo and of the Niger region; and above all, he organized the conquest of Annam and Tonkin in what became Indochina.

The last of these endeavours led to a war with the Qing dynasty China, which had a claim of suzerainty over the two provinces. The excitement caused in Paris by the sudden retreat of the French troops from Lạng Sơn during this war led to the Tonkin Affair: his violent denunciation by Clemenceau and other radicals, and his downfall on 30 March 1885. Although the treaty of peace with the Chinese Empire (9 June 1885), in which the Qing dynasty ceded suzerainty of Annam and Tonkin to France, was the work of his ministry, he would never again serve as premier.

The desire for a monarchy was strong in France in the early years of the Third Republic – Henri, Count of Chambord, having made a bid early in its history. A committed republican, Ferry undertook a wide-scale "purge" by dismissing many known monarchists from top positions in the magistrature, army, and civil and diplomatic service.

In the 1890s, he visited Algeria and provided a critical report. He predicted that Algeria could not escape a conflict between Indigènes and Europeans:

- He was interested in providing education to the Indigènes, while the settlers were sceptical about this topic.
- He was given a poor image of the settlers because they did not want to pay taxes.
- He also noted that the Indigène was contributing to the Communes de plein exercice without profiting from it.
- He considered the settlers were poorly chosen, and that they were too numerous
- He was in favour of the self-government of Algeria but considered the settlers were not educated enough to do so
- He considered that the Muslims did not want French citizenship, Military service, French mandatory schools, or civil French law.
- He considered that the Muslims wanted fewer taxes, taxes more used for their needs, the authority of the cadis, Muslim city councillors' involvement in the mayor election
- He also considered that the Land Laws were a failure.

=== Agreements with Germany ===
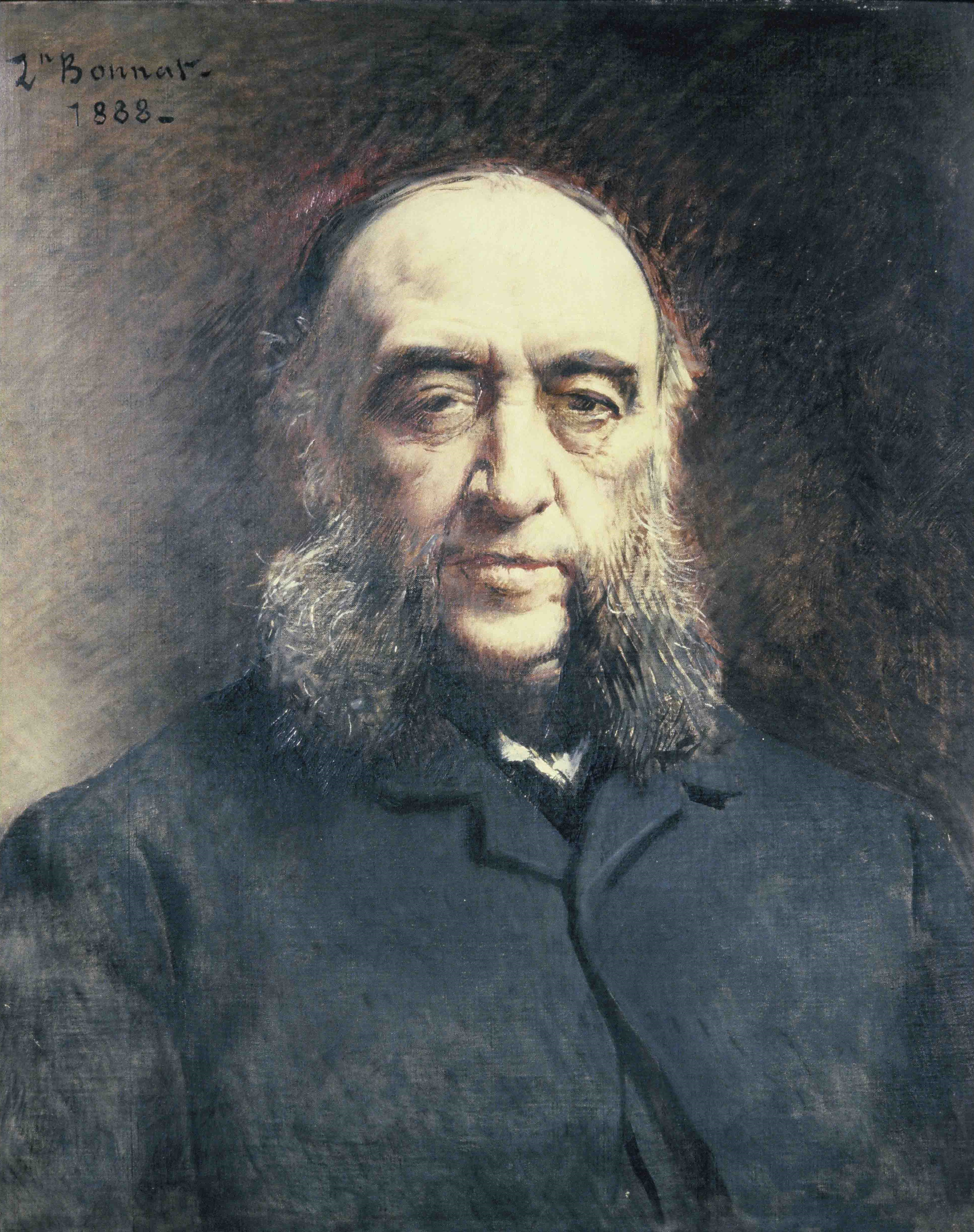
Portrait of Ferry by Léon Bonnat

The key to understanding Ferry's unique position in Third Republic history is that until his political critic Georges Clemenceau became prime minister twice in the 20th century, Ferry had the longest tenure as prime minister under that regime. He also played with political dynamite that eventually destroyed his success. Ferry (like his 20th-century equivalent Joseph Caillaux) believed in not confronting Wilhelmine Germany by threats of a future war of revenge. Most French politicians in the middle and right saw it as a sacred duty to one day lead France again against Germany to reclaim Alsace-Lorraine, and avenge the awful defeat of 1870. But Ferry realized that Germany was too powerful, and it made more sense to cooperate with Otto von Bismarck and avoid trouble. A sensible policy – but hardly popular.

Bismarck was constantly nervous about the situation with France. Although he had despised the ineptness of the French under Napoleon III and the government of Adolphe Thiers and Jules Favre, he had not planned for all the demands he presented to the French in 1870. He only wished to temporarily cripple France by the billion-franc reparation, but suddenly he was confronted by the demands of Marshals Albrecht von Roon and Helmut von Moltke (backed by Emperor Wilhelm I) to annex the two French provinces as further payment. Bismarck, for all his abilities regarding the manipulation of events, could not afford to anger the Prussian military. He got the two provinces, but he realized it would eventually have severe future repercussions.

Bismarck was able to ignore the French for most of the 1870s and early 1880s, but as he found problems with his three erstwhile allies (Austria, Russia, and Italy), he realized France might one day take advantage of this (as it did with Russia in 1894). When Ferry came up with a radically different approach to the situation and offered an olive branch, Bismarck reciprocated. A Franco-German friendship would alleviate problems of siding with either Austria or Russia, or Austria and Italy. Bismarck approved of the colonial expansion that France pursued under Ferry. He only had some problems with local German imperialists who were critical that Germany lacked colonies, so he found a few in the 1880s, making certain he did not confront French interests. But he also suggested Franco-German cooperation on the imperial front against the British Empire, thus hoping to create a wedge between the two Western European great powers. It did, as a result, leading to a major race for influence across Africa that nearly culminated in war in the next decade, at Fashoda in the Sudan in 1898. But by then, both Bismarck and Ferry were dead, and the rapprochement policy died when Ferry lost office. As for Fashoda, while it was a confrontation, it led to Britain and France eventually discussing their rival colonial goals, and agreeing to support each other's sphere of influence – the first step to the Entente Cordiale between the countries in 1904.

=== Later life ===
Ferry remained an influential member of the moderate Republican party and directed the opposition to General Boulanger. After the resignation of Jules Grévy on 2 December 1887, he was a candidate for the presidency of the republic, but the radicals refused to support him, and he withdrew in favour of Sadi Carnot.

On 10 December 1887, a man named Aubertin attempted to assassinate Jules Ferry, who would later die on 17 March 1893 from complications attributed to this wound. The Chamber of Deputies gave him a state funeral.

== Ferry's 1st ministry, 23 September 1880 – 14 November 1881 ==
- Jules Ferry – president of the council and minister of public instruction and fine arts
- Jules Barthélemy-Saint-Hilaire – minister of foreign affairs
- Jean Joseph Farre – minister of war
- Ernest Constans – minister of the interior and worship
- Pierre Magnin – minister of finance
- Jules Cazot – minister of justice
- Georges Charles Cloué – minister of marine and colonies
- Sadi Carnot – minister of public works
- Adolphe Cochery – minister of posts and telegraphs
- Pierre Tirard – minister of agriculture and commerce

== Ferry's 2nd ministry, 21 February 1883 – 6 April 1885 ==
- Jules Ferry – president of the council and minister of public instruction and fine arts
- Paul-Armand Challemel-Lacour – minister of foreign affairs
- Jean Thibaudin – minister of war
- Pierre Waldeck-Rousseau – minister of the interior
- Pierre Tirard – minister of finance
- Félix Martin-Feuillée – minister of justice and worship
- Charles Brun – minister of marine and colonies
- Jules Méline – minister of agriculture
- David Raynal – minister of public works
- Adolphe Cochery – minister of posts and telegraphs
- Anne Charles Hérisson – minister of commerce

Changes

- 9 August 1883 – Alexandre Louis François Peyron succeeds Charles Brun as minister of marine and colonies
- 9 October 1883 – Jean-Baptiste Campenon succeeds Thibaudin as minister of war.
- 20 November 1883 – Jules Ferry succeeds Challemel-Lacour as minister of foreign affairs. Armand Fallières succeeds Ferry as minister of public instruction and fine arts.
- 14 October 1884 – Maurice Rouvier succeeds Hérisson as minister of commerce
- 3 January 1885 – Jules Louis Lewal succeeds Campenon as minister of war.

== See also ==
- Jules Ferry laws
- Opportunist Republicans
- Vergonha
- Nursery Schools of France

== Sources ==
- Burollet, Pierre F. (21 June 1995), "L'exploration de la Tunisie avant la première guerre mondiale", Travaux du Comitée français d'Histoire de la Géologie (in French), 9 (3), Comité Français d'Histoire de la Géologie (COFRHIGEO) (séance du 21 juin 1995)
- Ducloux (1913), "Philippe THOMAS (1843–1910)", Bulletin de la Société centrale de médecine vétérinaire, Paris: Société de médecine vétérinaire (France) / Asselin
- Tawadros, Edward (2 November 2011), Geology of North Africa, CRC Press, ISBN 978-0-415-87420-5
- Taylor, A. J. P. Germany's First Bid For Colonies, 1884–1885: A Move in Bismarck's European Policy (New York: W. W. Norton & Co., Inc. – the Norton Library, 1970), pp. 17–31: Chapter 1. Bismarck's Approach to France, December 1883 – April 1884.

== See also ==
- Normal schools in France

Political offices
Preceded by Agénor Bardoux	Minister of Public Instruction and Fine Arts; 1879–1881	Succeeded by Paul Bert
Preceded by Charles de Freycinet	Prime Minister of France; 1880–1881	Succeeded by Léon Gambetta
Preceded by Paul Bert	Minister of Public Instruction and Fine Arts; 1882	Succeeded by Jules Duvaux
Preceded by Armand Fallières	Prime Minister of France; 1883–1885	Succeeded by Henri Brisson
Preceded by Jules Duvaux	Minister of Public Instruction and Fine Arts; 1883	Succeeded by Armand Fallières
Preceded by Paul-Armand Challemel-Lacour	Minister of Foreign Affairs; 1883–1885	Succeeded by Charles de Freycinet
Preceded by Philippe Le Royer	President of the Senate; 1893	Succeeded by Paul-Armand Challemel-Lacour
