= Paul-Armand Challemel-Lacour =

French statesman

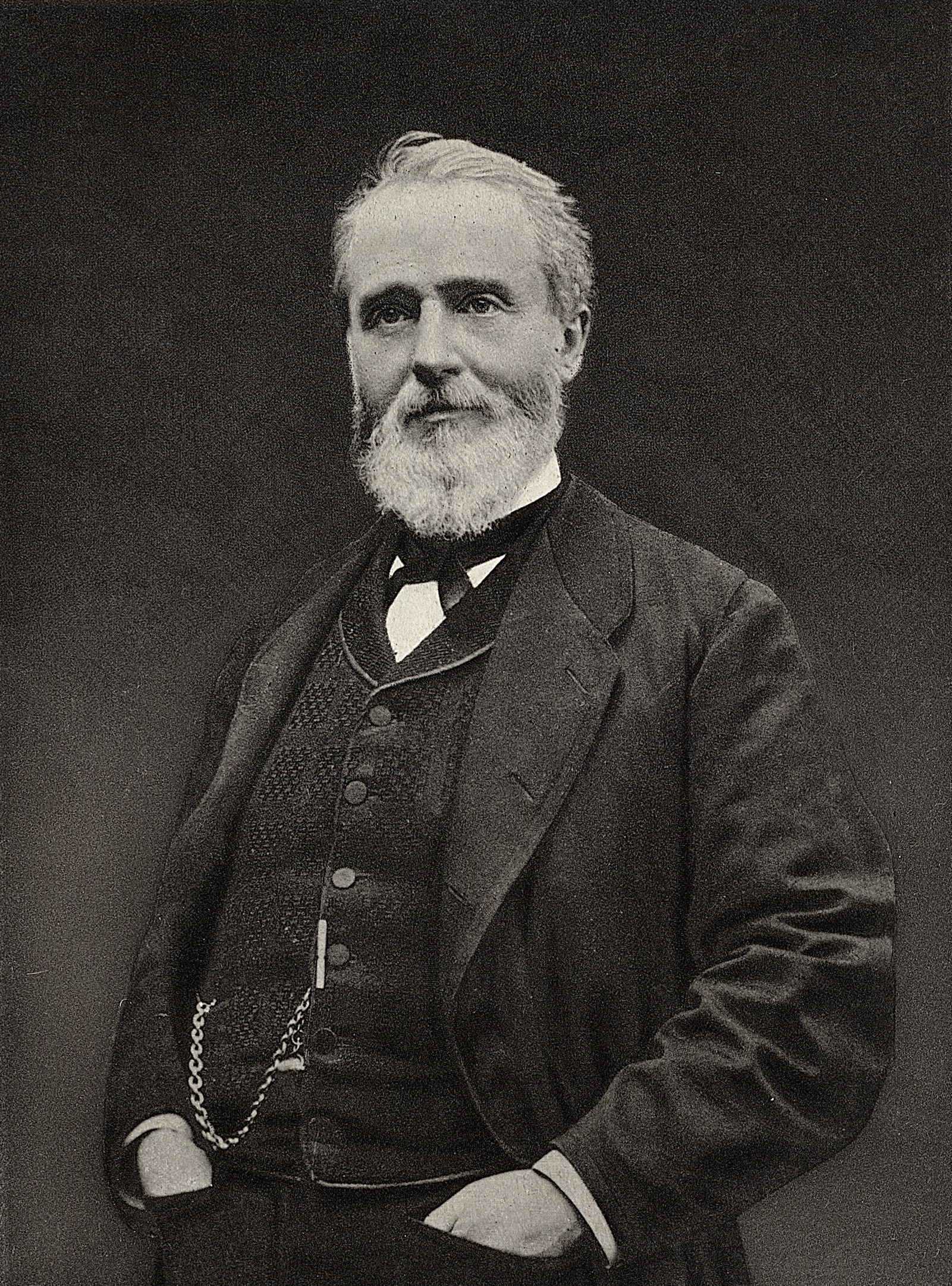
- Born: 19 May 1827; Avranches, Kingdom of France
- Died: 26 October 1896 (aged 69); Paris, France
- Occupation: statesman

Signature
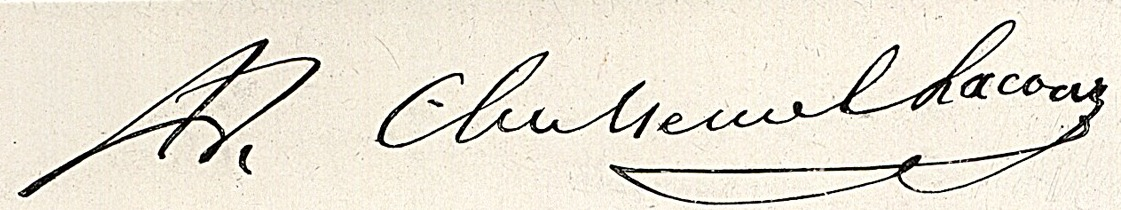

Paul-Armand Challemel-Lacour (French pronunciation: [pɔl aʁmɑ̃ ʃalmɛl lakuʁ]; 19 May 1827 – 26 October 1896) was a French statesman.

== Biography ==
Paul-Armand Challemel-Lacour was born in Avranches in the Manche département of northwestern France. After passing through the École Normale Supérieure he became professor of philosophy successively at Pau and at Limoges. The coup d'état of 1851 by Napoleon III caused his expulsion from France for his republican opinions. He travelled on the continent, gave conferences in Belgium and in 1856 settled down as professor of French literature at the Federal Polytechnic Institute Zurich, today the ETH Zurich. The amnesty of 1859 enabled him to return to France, but a projected course of lectures on history and art was immediately suppressed. He now supported himself by his pen, and became a regular contributor to the reviews.

On the fall of the Second French Empire in September 1870 the government of national defence appointed him prefect of the Rhône département, in which capacity he had to suppress the Communist rising at Lyon. Resigning his post on the 5 February 1871, he was in January 1872 elected to the National Assembly, and in 1876 to the Senate. He sat at first on the Extreme Left; but his philosophic and critical temperament was not in harmony with extreme French radicalism, and his attitude towards political questions underwent a steady modification, till the close of his life saw him the foremost representative of moderate republicanism.

During Léon Gambetta's lifetime, however, Challemel-Lacour was one of his warmest supporters, and he was for a time editor of Gambetta's organ, La République française. In 1879 he was appointed French ambassador at Bern, and in 1880 was transferred to London; but he lacked the temperament of a successful diplomat. He resigned in 1882, and in February 1883 became minister of foreign affairs in the Jules Ferry cabinet, but retired in November of the same year.

In 1890 he was elected vice-president of the Senate, and in 1893 succeeded Jules Ferry as its president, a position he held from 27 March 1893 to 16 January 1896. His clear and reasoned eloquence placed him at the head of contemporary French orators. In 1893 he also became a member of the Académie française. He distinguished himself by the vigour with which he upheld the Senate against the encroachments of the chamber, but in 1896 failing health forced him to resign, and he died in Paris.

== Works ==
He published a translation of A Heinrich Ritter's Geschichte der Philosophie (1861); La Philosophie individualiste: étude sur Guillaume de Humboldt (1864); and an edition of the works of Madame d'Epinay (1869).

In 1897 appeared Joseph Reinach's edition of the Œuvres oratoires de Challemel-Lacour.

Political offices
Preceded by Armand Fallières	Minister of Foreign Affairs; 1883	Succeeded by Jules Ferry
Preceded by Jules Ferry	President of the Senate; 1893–1896	Succeeded by Émile Loubet
