= Jules Duvaux =

French politician

Jules Duvaux (21 May 1827 – 2 June 1902) was a French politician of the French Third Republic. He was born in Nancy, France. He was a member of the Chamber of Deputies of France in 1876. He was minister of public instruction and fine arts (7 August 1882 – 21 February 1883) in the governments of Charles Duclerc and Armand Fallières. His predecessor and successor in this office was Jules Ferry.

== Sources ==
- "Jules Duvaux", in Adolphe Robert and Gaston Cougny, Dictionnaire des parlementaires français (1789–1891), Bourloton, Paris, 1889 Edition details Wikisource
