= Mont-sous-Vaudrey =

Commune in Bourgogne-Franche-Comté, France

- Commune
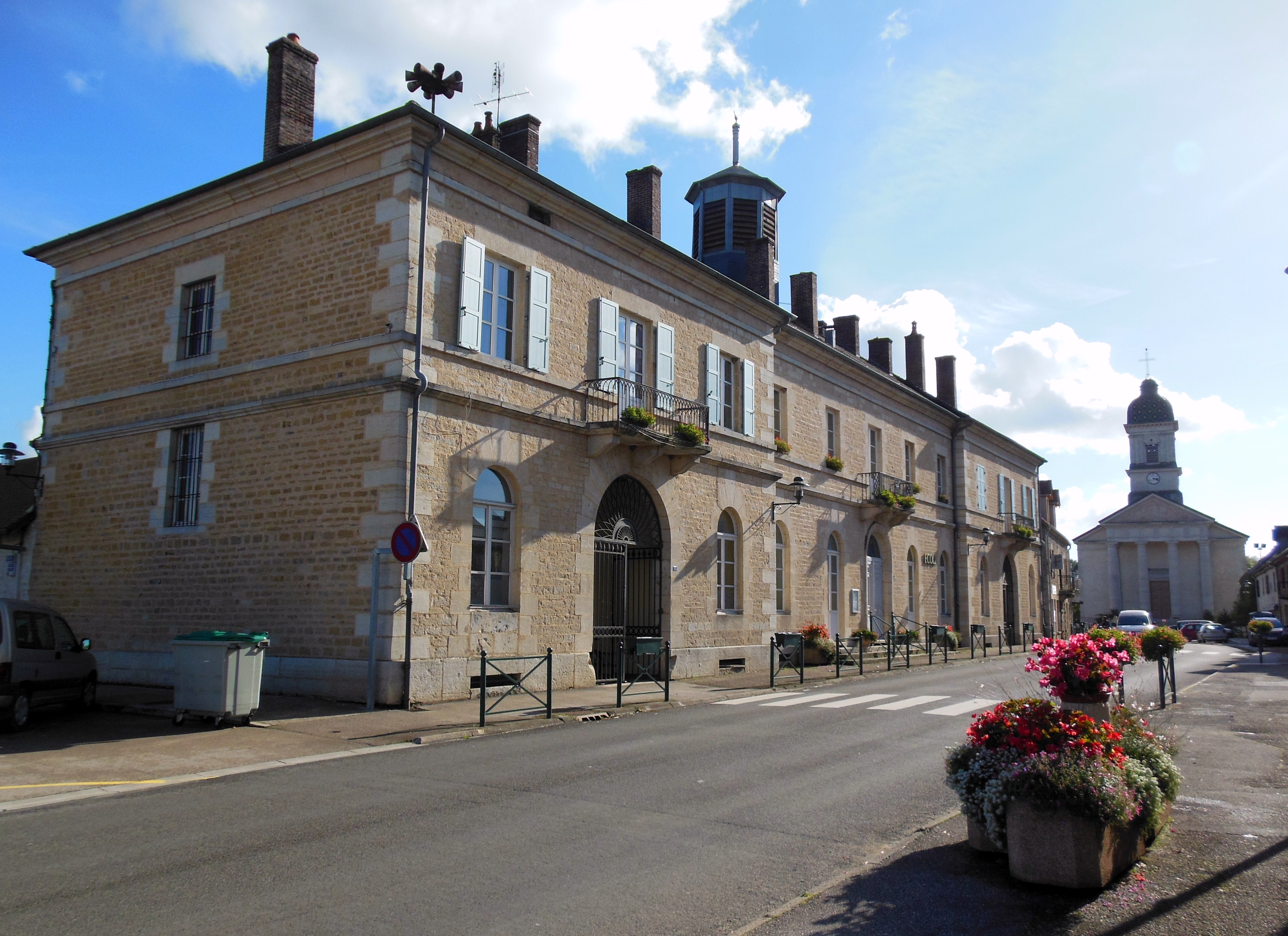
- Former town hall, now a school
- Location of Mont-sous-Vaudrey
- Location within France Location within Bourgogne-Franche-Comté
- Coordinates: 46°58′52″N 5°36′11″E
- Country: France
- Region: Bourgogne-Franche-Comté
- Department: Jura
- Arrondissement: Dole
- Canton: Mont-sous-Vaudrey

Government
  - Mayor (2020–2026): Paulette Giancatarino
- Area^{1}: 14.86 km^{2} (5.74 sq mi)
- Highest elevation: 252 m (827 ft)
- Lowest elevation: 211 m (692 ft)
- Population (2023): 1,309
  - Density: 88.09/km^{2} (228.1/sq mi)
- Time zone: UTC+01:00 (CET)
  - Summer (DST): UTC+02:00 (CEST)
- INSEE/Postal code: 39365 /39380
- ^{1} French Land Register data, which excludes lakes, ponds, glaciers > 1 km^{2} (0.386 sq mi or 247 acres) and river estuaries.

Mont-sous-Vaudrey (French pronunciation: [mɔ̃ su vodʁɛ]) is a commune in the Jura department in Bourgogne-Franche-Comté in eastern France.

== Population ==
Historical population
Year	Pop.	±% p.a.
1968	804	—
1975	844	+0.70%
1982	994	+2.36%
1990	1,099	+1.26%
1999	1,165	+0.65%
2007	1,255	+0.93%
2012	1,248	−0.11%
2017	1,265	+0.27%
2023	1,309	+0.57%
Source: INSEE

== Personalities ==
Mont-sous-Vaudrey was the birthplace of Jules Grévy (1813-1891), President of the French Third Republic.

== See also ==
- Communes of the Jura department
