= Jean-Jules Clamageran =

French politician

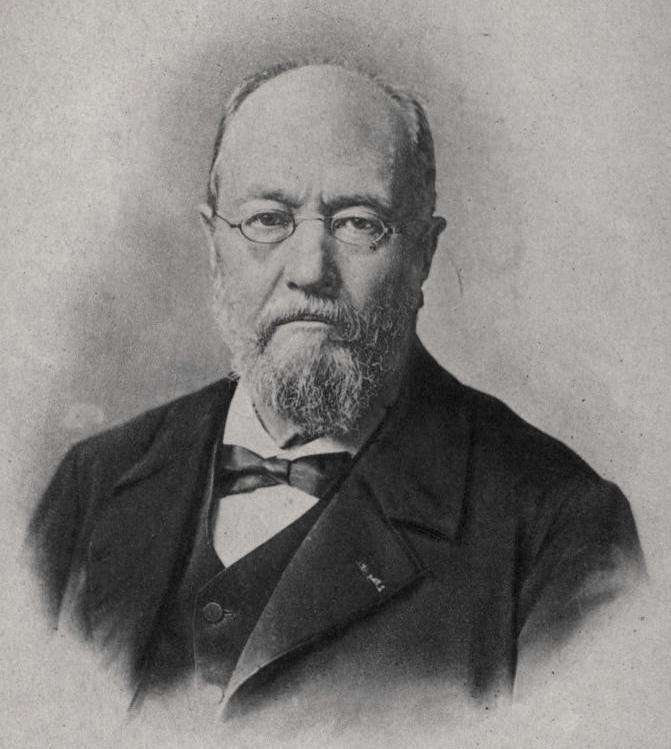
Jean-Jules Clamageran

Jean-Jules Clamageran (29 March 1827 – 4 June 1903) was a French politician of the French Third Republic. He was briefly minister of finance (6–16 April 1885) in the ministry of Henri Brisson. He was made a life senator in the Senate of France in 1882.

== Decorations ==
- Chevalier de la Légion d'honneur

== Sources ==
- "Jean-Jules Clamageran", in Adolphe Robert and Gaston Cougny, Dictionnaire des parlementaires français (1789–1891), Bourloton, Paris, 1889 Edition details Wikisource

== Bibliography ==
- André Encrevé, « Jean-Jules Clamageran », in Patrick Cabanel et André Encrevé (dir.), Dictionnaire biographique des protestants français de 1787 à nos jours, tome 1 : A-C, Les Éditions de Paris Max Chaleil, Paris, 2015, pp. 686–687, ISBN 978-2846211901.
