= David Raynal =

French politician (1840–1903)

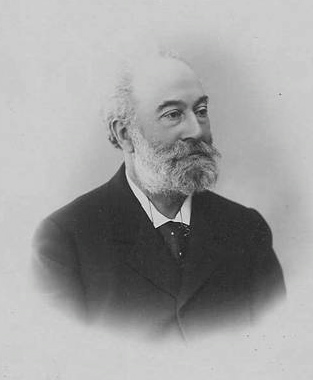
David Raynal

David Raynal (26 July 1840 – 28 January 1903) was a French politician of the French Third Republic. He was a member of the Chamber of Deputies of France (1879–1897) and Senate of France (1897–1903). He was twice minister of public works (14 January 1881 – 30 January 1882; 21 February 1883 – 6 April 1885) in the governments of Léon Gambetta and Jules Ferry. He was minister of the interior (3 December 1893 – 30 May 1894) in the government of Jean Casimir-Perier.

He was of Portuguese-Jewish descent through his mother Esther-Sophie, member of the Rodrigues-Henriques Family.

== Sources ==
- André Bénac, Conférence sur la vie et l'œuvre politique de David Raynal, 1925
- Pierre Birnbaum, Les Fous de la République: Histoire politique des Juifs d'État, de Gambetta à Vichy, 1992
- "David Raynal", in Adolphe Robert and Gaston Cougny, Dictionnaire des parlementaires français (1789-1891), Bourloton, Paris, 1889 Edition details Wikisource
