= Jean Thibaudin =

French Army General and politician

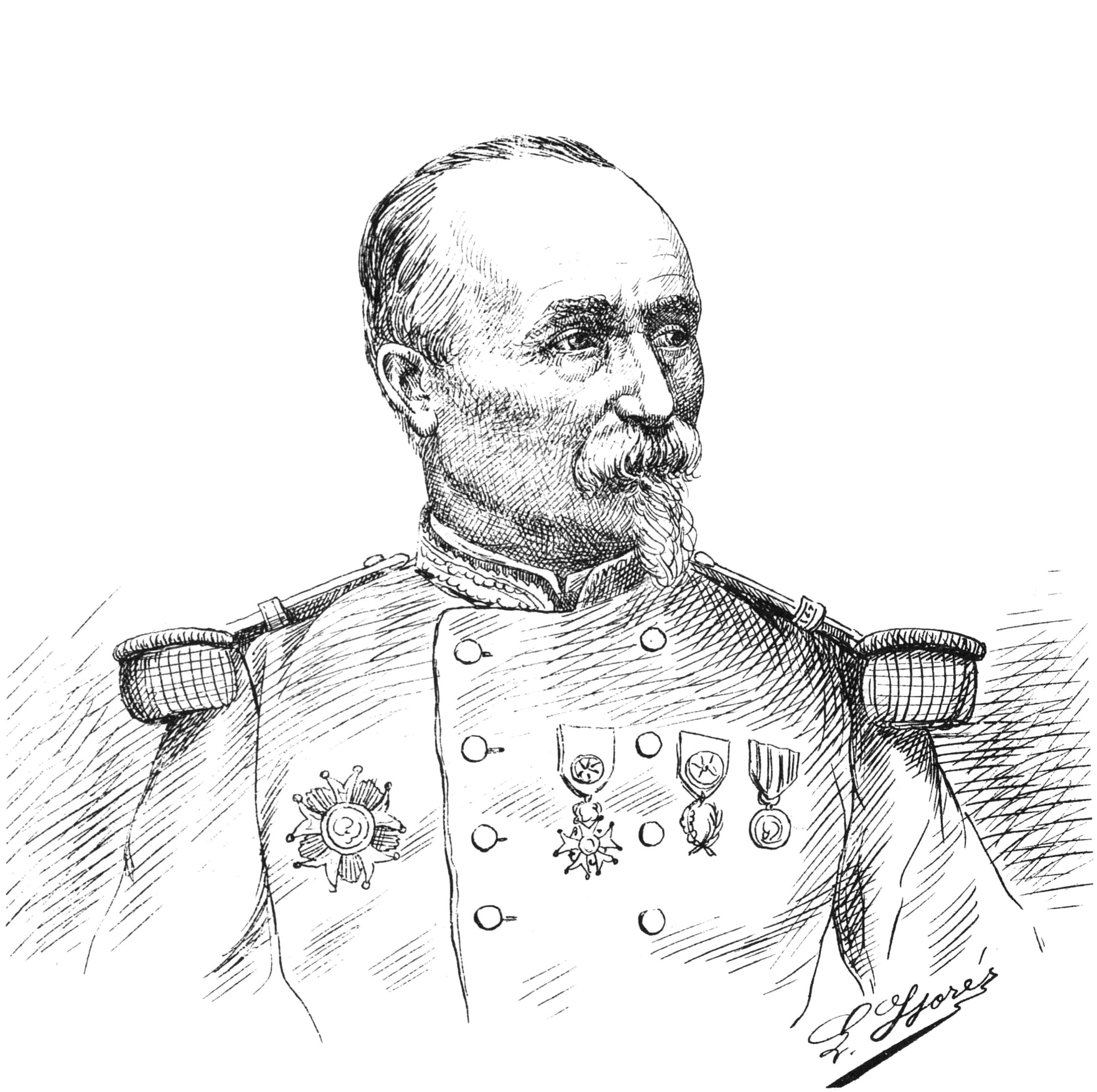
Jean Thibaudin (1822–1905)

Jean Thibaudin (November 1822 – 1905) was a French general and politician of the French Third Republic. He was educated at the École spéciale militaire de Saint-Cyr in Brittany. He was involved in the colonization of Madagascar.

He was minister of war (January–October 1883) in the government of Jules Ferry.

== Sources ==
- Larousse du XX^{e} siècle
