= Paul Devès =

French politician (1837–1899)

Pierre Paul Devès
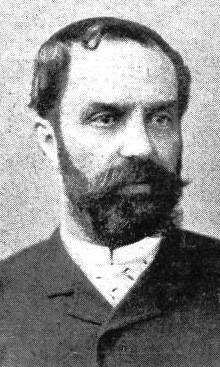
- Paul Devès from Le Monde illustré, 18 November 1899

Minister of Agriculture
- In office 14 November 1881 – 26 January 1882
- Prime Minister: Léon Gambetta
- Preceded by: Alexandre Goüin
- Succeeded by: François de Mahy

Minister of Justice and Religion
- In office 7 August 1882 – 20 February 1883
- Prime Minister: Charles Duclerc
- Preceded by: Gustave Humbert
- Succeeded by: Armand Fallières (Religion)

Minister of Justice
- In office 7 August 1882 – 20 February 1883
- Prime Minister: Armand Fallières
- Preceded by: Gustave Humbert
- Succeeded by: Félix Martin-Feuillée

Personal details
- Born: 3 November 1837 Aurillac, Cantal, France
- Died: 12 November 1899 (aged 62) Paris, France
- Occupation: Barrister, businessman

Pierre Paul Devès (3 November 1837 – 12 November 1899) was a French politician. He was a deputy from 1876 to 1884, and senator from 1886 until his death in 1899. He was Minister of Agriculture from 1881 to 1882, and Minister of Justice from 1882 to 1883.

== Early years (1837–76) ==
Pierre Paul Devès was born on 3 November 1837 in Aurillac, Cantal. He trained as a lawyer and joined the bar in Béziers. He became a member of the general council of the Hérault representing the canton of Servian. During the Franco-Prussian War (1870–71) he was state prosecutor in Béziers from 20 September 1870 to 7 February 1871, when he became mayor of Béziers.

== National politics (1876–99) ==
Devès was elected as a deputy for Béziers on 20 February 1876, and sat with the Republican Left. He was reelected after the house was dissolved on 14 October 1877. He was reelected in the second round on 4 September 1881, then resigned and ran successfully for election for Bagnères-de-Bigorre on 18 December 1881. He was Minister of Agriculture from 14 November 1881 to 26 January 1882 in the cabinet of Léon Gambetta. His ministry was created by Gambetta with the aim of rallying the peasants to the Republican cause.

Devès was Minister of Justice and Religion from 7 August 1882 to 28 January 1883 in the cabinet of Charles Duclerc, then Minister of Justice from 29 January 1884 to 20 February 1883 in the cabinet of Armand Fallières. On the issue of the naturalization of Algerian Jews, Devès made a tacit concession to antisemitism in Algeria and France. He favored a literal interpretation of the 1870 Crémieux decree, which supported naturalization of Jews in the areas of Algeria that were departments in 1870, but not in the M'zab protectorate in the south.

In the elections of 4 October 1885 Devès ran on the Republican list for Hautes-Pyrénées and was not elected. He again failed to be elected on 13 December 1885 in the Seine department. On 29 August 1886 he was elected senator for the Cantal department, and sat with the Left. He was reelected on 7 January 1894. He held office until 1 January 1899. Paul Devès died in Paris on 12 November 1899 at the age of 62.

== Sources ==
- Jolly, Jean (1960–1977). "Devès, Pierre Paul". Dictionnaire des parlementaires français (1889-1940). Paris: Presses universitaires de France. ISBN 2-1100-1998-0.
- Fuligni, Bruno (2010). L'assemblée littéraire: petite anthologie des députés poètes. Ginkgo Editeur. ISBN 978-2-84679-078-9.
- Robert, Adolphe; Cougny, Gaston (1889–1891). "Devès, Pierre Paul". In Edgar Bourloton (ed.). Dictionnaire des parlementaires français depuis le 1er mai 1789 jusqu'au 1er mai 1889 (in French).
- Stein, Sarah Abrevaya (6 May 2014). Saharan Jews and the Fate of French Algeria. University of Chicago Press. ISBN 978-0-226-12388-2.
