= Aumont, Jura =

Commune in Bourgogne-Franche-Comté, France

Aumont
- Commune
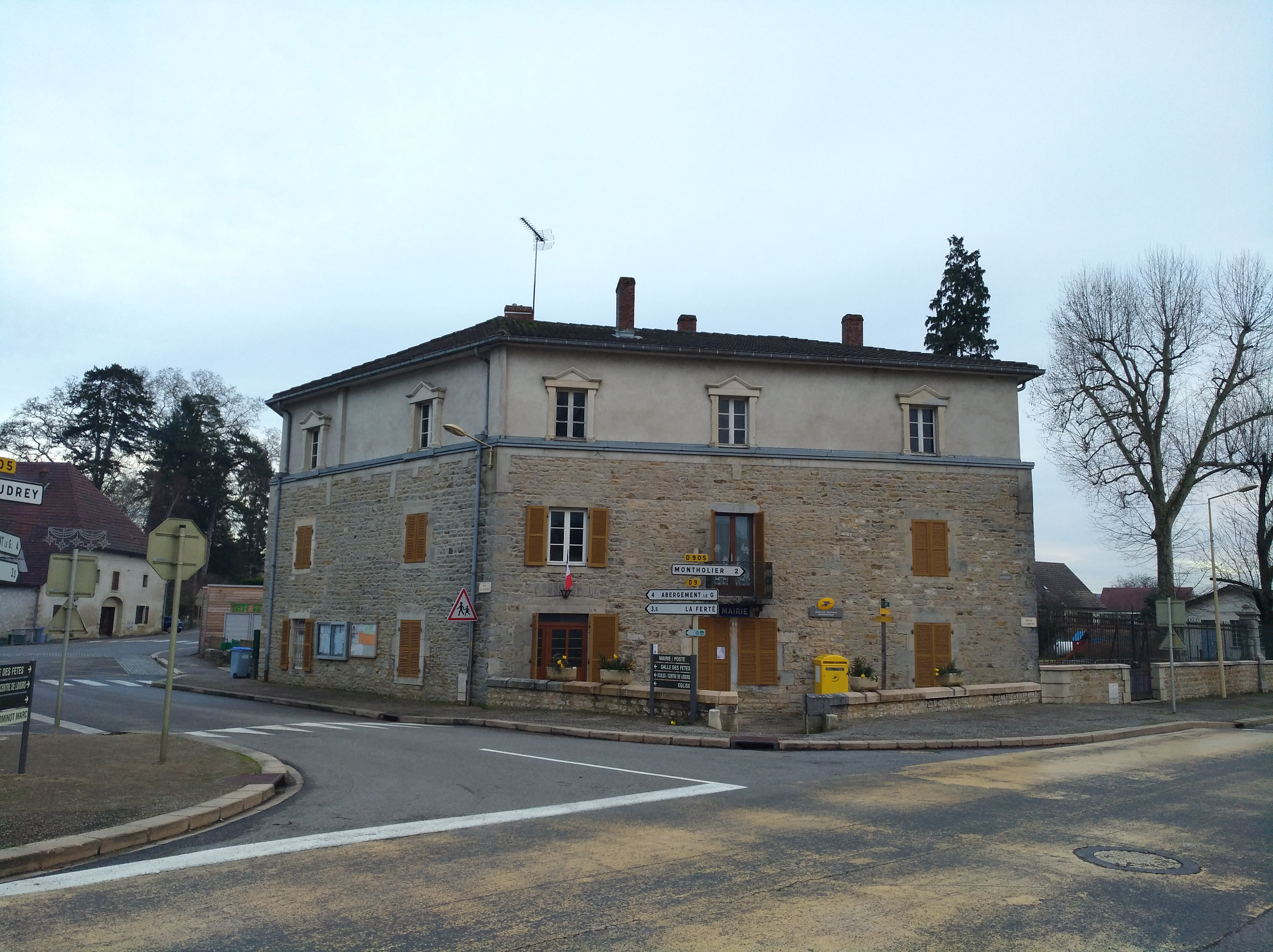
- The town hall in Aumont
- Location of Aumont
- Location within France Location within Bourgogne-Franche-Comté
- Coordinates: 46°54′33″N 5°38′03″E
- Country: France
- Region: Bourgogne-Franche-Comté
- Department: Jura
- Arrondissement: Lons-le-Saunier
- Canton: Bletterans
- Intercommunality: CC Arbois, Poligny, Salins – Cœur du Jura

Government
  - Mayor (2020–2026): Yves Décoté
- Area^{1}: 7.97 km^{2} (3.08 sq mi)
- Highest elevation: 297 m (974 ft)
- Lowest elevation: 227 m (745 ft)
- Population (2023): 447
  - Density: 56.1/km^{2} (145/sq mi)
- Time zone: UTC+01:00 (CET)
  - Summer (DST): UTC+02:00 (CEST)
- INSEE/Postal code: 39028 /39800
- ^{1} French Land Register data, which excludes lakes, ponds, glaciers > 1 km^{2} (0.386 sq mi or 247 acres) and river estuaries.

Aumont (French pronunciation: [omɔ̃]) is a commune in the Jura department in the region of Bourgogne-Franche-Comté in eastern France.

== Populations ==
Historical population
Year	Pop.	±% p.a.
1968	416	—
1975	383	−1.17%
1982	435	+1.84%
1990	455	+0.56%
1999	405	−1.29%
2007	405	+0.00%
2012	442	+1.76%
2017	468	+1.15%
2023	447	−0.76%
Source: INSEE

== See also ==
- Communes of the Jura department
