= Anne Charles Hérisson =

French lawyer and politician

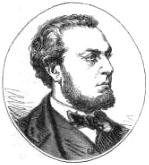

Charles Hérisson (12 October 1831 – 23 November 1893) was a French lawyer and politician of the French Third Republic. He was a member of the National Assembly of 1871, where he joined the Opportunist Republican parliamentary group, Gauche républicaine. He served as minister of commerce in the Government of France. He was a member of the Legion of Honour.

== Sources ==
- "Anne Charles Hérisson", in Adolphe Robert and Gaston Cougny, Dictionnaire des parlementaires français (1789-1891), Bourloton, Paris, 1889 Edition details Wikisource
