= Catholic Church in France =

- French: Église catholique en France
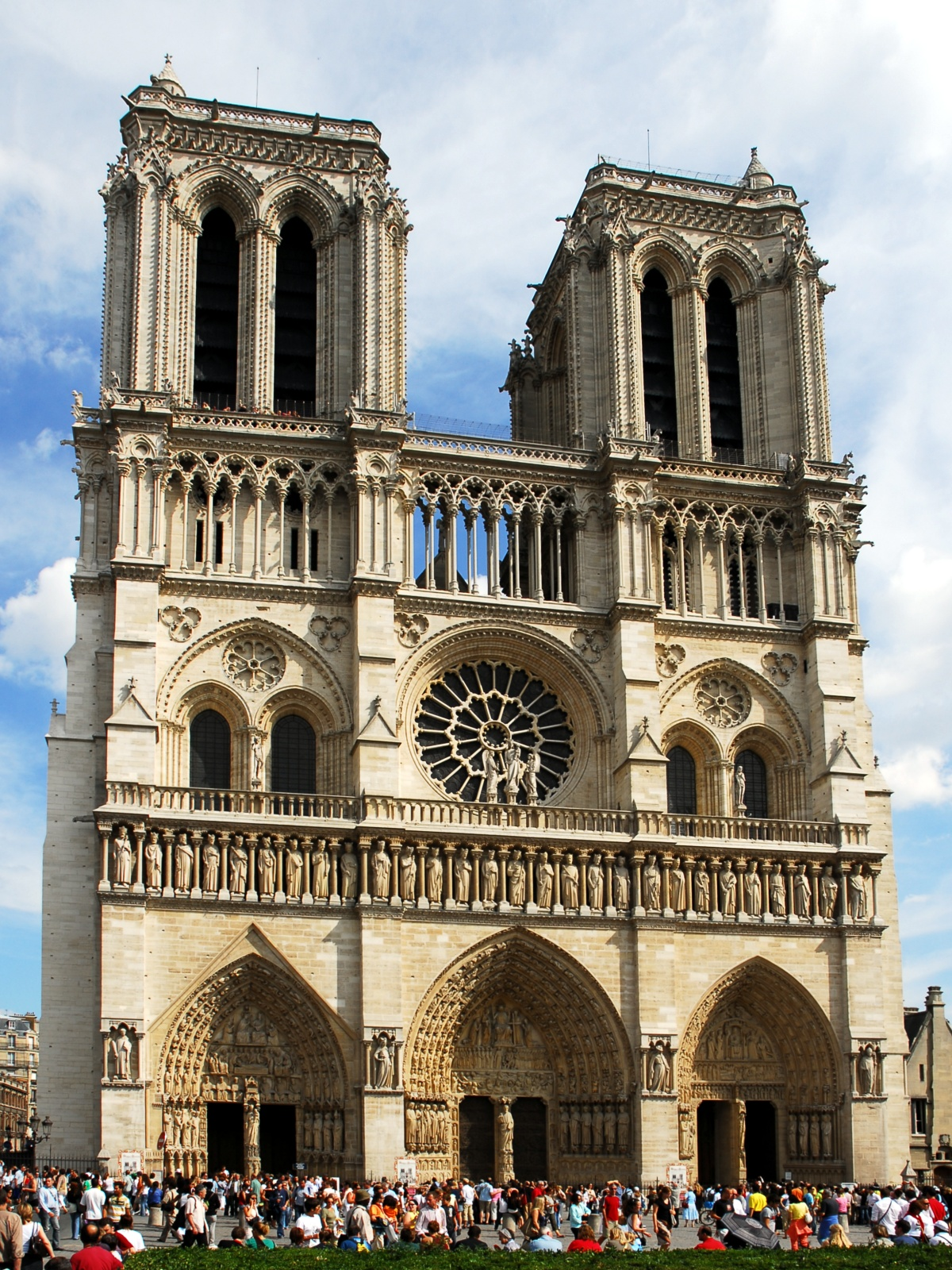
- Notre-Dame de Paris
- Type: National polity
- Classification: Catholic
- Scripture: Bible
- Theology: Catholic theology
- Governance: CEF
- Pope: Leo XIV
- President: Jean-Marc Aveline
- Primate of the Gauls: Olivier de Germay
- Apostolic Nuncio: Celestino Migliore
- Region: Metropolitan France, Monaco
- Language: French, Latin
- Headquarters: Notre-Dame de Paris
- Founder: Saint Remigius
- Origin: c. 177 Christianity in Gaul c. 496 Frankish Christianity; Gaul, Roman Empire
- Separations: Huguenots (16th century)
- Members: 27,000,000–58,000,000
- Official website: Episcopal Conference of France

The Catholic Church in France, Gallican Church, or French Catholic Church, is part of the worldwide Catholic Church in communion with the Pope in Rome. Established in the second century in unbroken communion with the bishop of Rome, it is sometimes called the "eldest daughter of the Church" (French: fille aînée de l'Église).

The first written records of Christians in France date from the second century, when Irenaeus detailed the deaths of 90-year-old bishop Saint Pothinus of Lugdunum (Lyon) and other martyrs of the 177 AD persecution in Lyon. In 496 Remigius baptized King Clovis I, who therefore converted from paganism to Catholicism. In 800, Pope Leo III crowned Charlemagne Emperor of the Roman Empire, forming the political and religious foundations of Christendom in Europe and establishing in earnest the French government's long historical association with the Catholic Church. In reaction, the French Revolution (1789–1799) was followed by implicit rejection of the Catholic Church. Since the beginning of the 20th century, Laïcité, absolute neutrality of the state with respect to religious doctrine, is the official policy of the French Republic.

Estimates of the proportion of Catholics in 2020 range between 47% and 88% of France's population, with the higher figure including lapsed Catholics and "Catholic atheists". The Catholic Church in France is organised into 98 dioceses, which in 2012 were served by 7,000 sub-75 priests. Eighty to 90 priests are ordained every year, although the church would need eight times as many to compensate the number of priest deaths. Approximately 45,000 Catholic church buildings and chapels are spread out among 36,500 cities, towns, and villages in France, but a majority are no longer regularly used for Mass. Notable churches of France include Notre Dame de Paris, Chartres Cathedral, Dijon Cathedral, Reims Cathedral, Saint-Sulpice, Paris, Basilique du Sacre-Coeur, Strasbourg Cathedral, Eglise de la Madeleine, and Amiens Cathedral. Its national shrine, Lourdes, is visited by 5 million pilgrims yearly. The capital city, Paris, is a major pilgrimage site for Catholics as well.

In recent decades, France has emerged as a stronghold for the small but growing Traditionalist Catholic movement, along with the United States, England and other English-speaking countries. The Society of Saint Pius X, a canonically irregular priestly society founded by French Archbishop Marcel Lefebvre has a large presence in the country, as do other traditionalist priestly societies in full communion with Rome such as the Priestly Fraternity of St. Peter, Institute of Christ the King Sovereign Priest and others.

Some of the most famous French saints and blesseds include St. Denis, St. Thérèse of Lisieux, St. Irenaeus, St. John Vianney (the Curé of Ars), St. Joan of Arc, St. Bernadette, St. Genevieve, St. Louis IX of France, St. Elizabeth of the Trinity, St. Vincent de Paul, St. Louise de Marillac, St. Catherine Labouré, St. Louis de Montfort, St. Jean-Baptiste de La Salle, St. Marcellin Champagnat, St. Francis de Sales, St. Margaret Mary Alacoque, Bl. Nicholas Barré, and St.Bernard of Clairvaux.

== History ==
=== Roman Gauls and early Christianity ===
According to long-standing tradition, Mary, Martha, Lazarus (Marie, Marthe and Lazare in French) and some companions, who were expelled by persecutions from the Holy Land, traversed the Mediterranean in a frail boat with neither rudder nor mast and landed at Saintes-Maries-de-la-Mer near Arles. Provençal tradition names Lazarus as the first bishop of Marseille, while Martha purportedly went on to tame a terrible beast in nearby Tarascon. Pilgrims visited their tombs at the abbey of Vézelay in Burgundy. In the Abbey of the Trinity at Vendôme, a phylactery was said to contain a tear shed by Jesus at the tomb of Lazarus. The cathedral of Autun, not far away, is dedicated to Lazarus as Saint Lazaire.

The first written records of Christians in France date from the 2nd century when Irenaeus detailed the deaths of ninety-year-old bishop Pothinus of Lugdunum (Lyon) and other martyrs of the 177 persecution in Lyon.

The emperor Theodosius I (r. 379-95) makes Christianity the official state religion of the Roman Empire in 380.

=== Conversion of the Franks ===
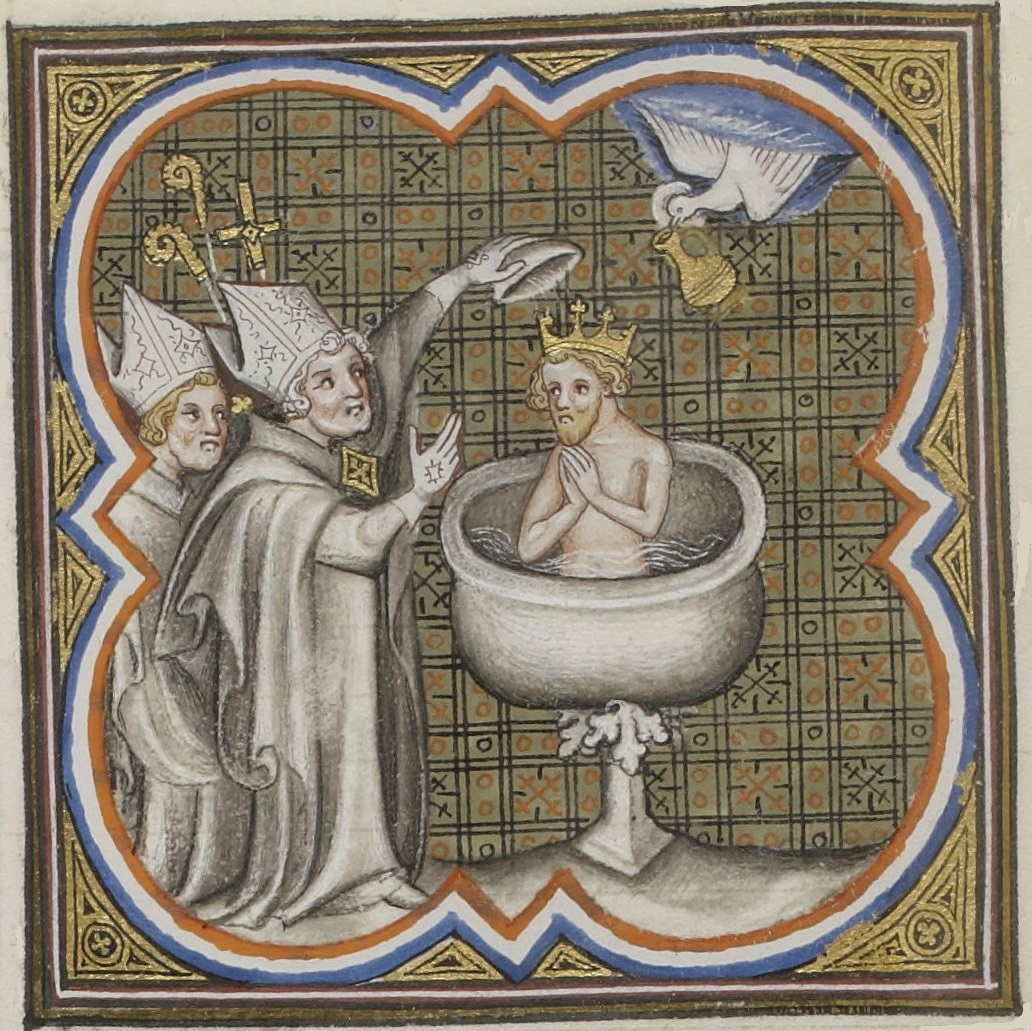
Baptism of Clovis

In 496, Remigius baptized Clovis I, who was converted from paganism to Catholicism. Clovis I, considered the founder of France, made himself the ally and protector of the papacy and his predominantly Catholic subjects.

=== Medieval Christendom and Crusades ===
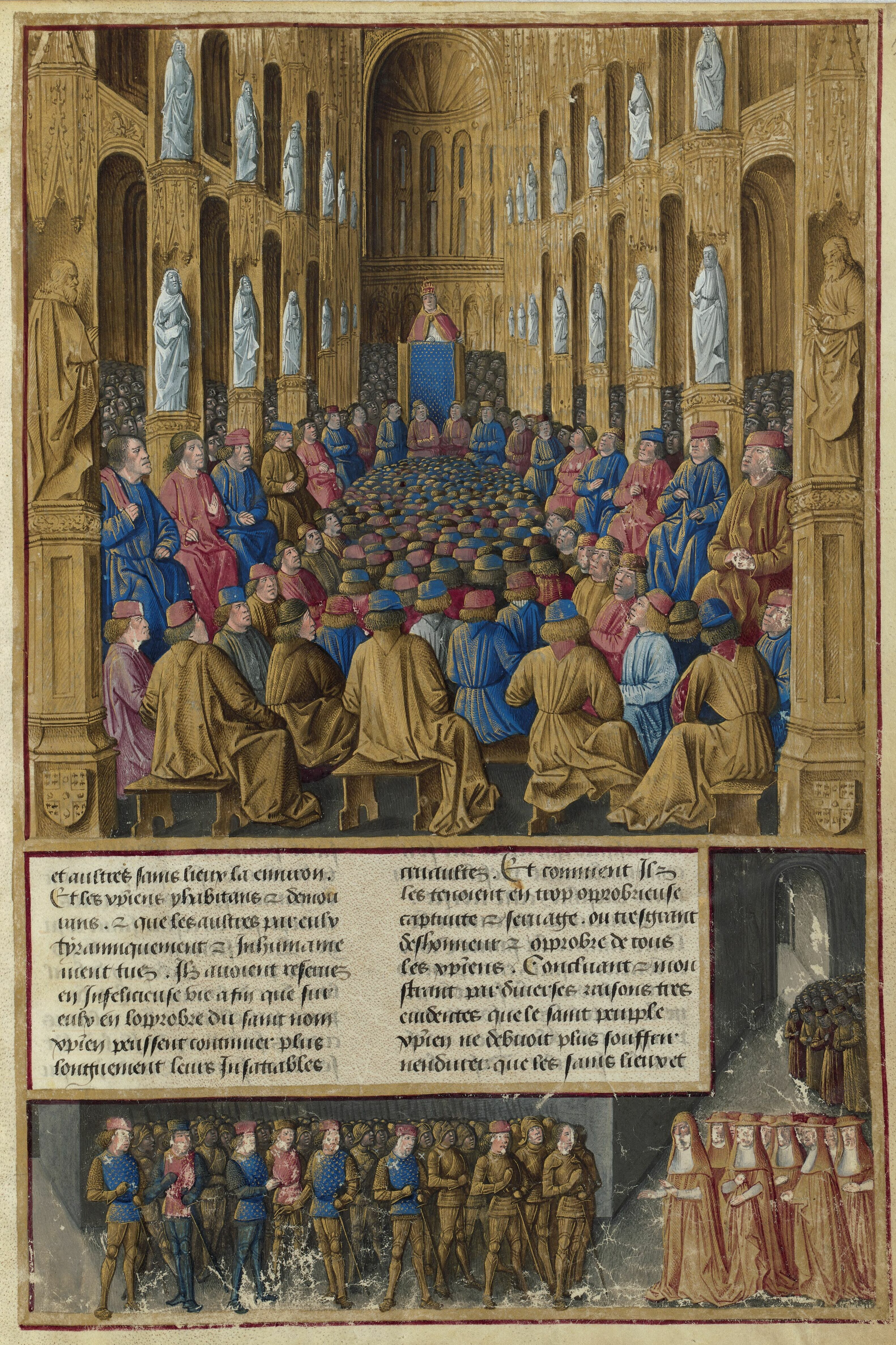
Pope Urban II at the Council of Clermont, given a late Gothic setting in this illumination from the Livre des Passages d'Outre-mer, of c. 1490 (Bibliothèque nationale)

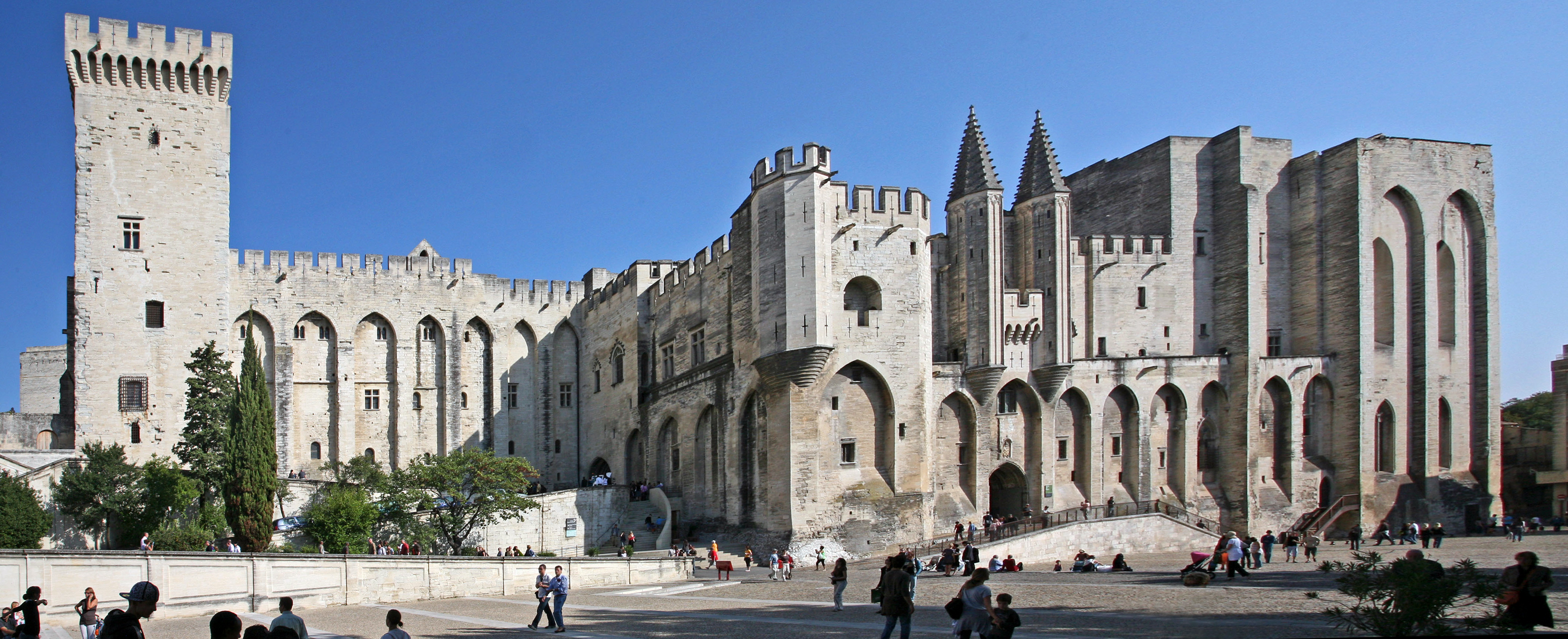
The papal palace in Avignon, where the popes resided from 1309 to 1376

On Christmas Day 800, Pope Leo III crowned Charlemagne Emperor of the Holy Roman Empire, forming the political and religious foundations of Christendom and establishing in earnest the French government's longstanding historical association with the Catholic Church.

The Council of Clermont, a mixed synod of ecclesiastics and laymen led by Pope Urban II in November 1095 at Clermont-Ferrand triggered the First Crusade.

The Kingdom of France and its aristocracy were prominent players in the Crusades in general. Following the Fourth Crusade, a period known as the Frankokratia existed where French Latin Catholics took over parts of the Byzantine Empire. A crusade also took place on French territory in the County of Toulouse (contemporary Languedoc) with the Albigensian Crusade in the 13th century, called by Pope Innocent III. This played out on local level with fighting between the Catholic White Brotherhood and the Cathar Black Brotherhood. The Cathars lost and were subsequently exterminated. In 1312, the French monarch Philip IV of France was involved in the suppression of the Knights Templar by Pope Clement V; Philip was in deep financial dept to the Templars.

The Avignon Papacy was the period from 1309 to 1377 during which seven French popes, resided in Avignon.

=== Renaissance Church and Protestantism ===
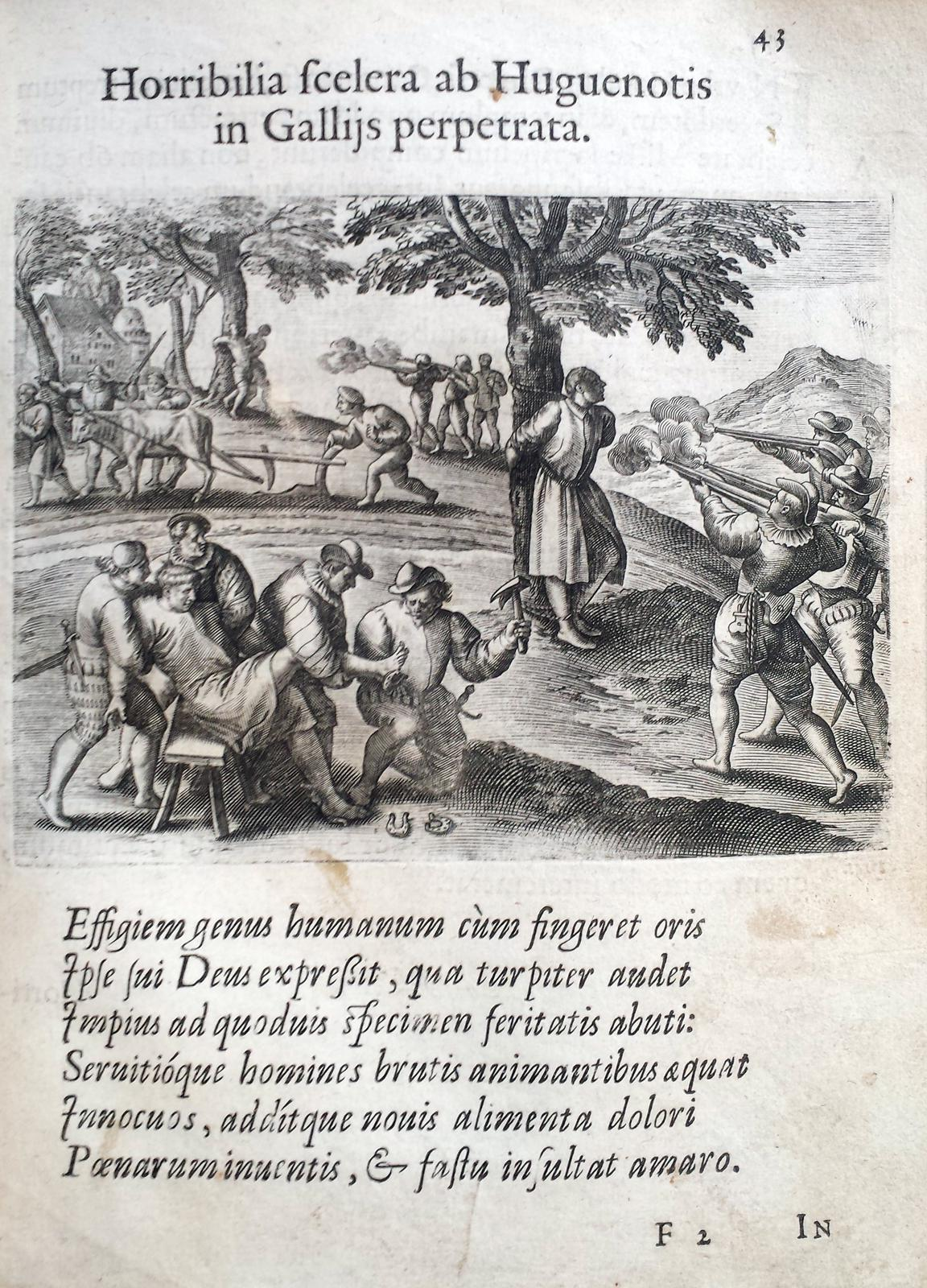
The crimes of the Huguenots in France; four Huguenots nailing a horseshoe to a Catholic on the left; three Huguenots executing a Catholic tied to a tree; men plowing the land with an ox; behind that another execution of two Catholics tied to a tree; Latin letterpress on verso; illustration to an edition of the Theatrum Crudelitatum Haereticorum Nostri Temporis (Richard Verstegen, 1588)

Prior to the French Revolution, the Catholic Church had been the official state religion of France since the conversion to Christianity of Clovis I, leading to France being called "the eldest daughter of the Church". The King of France was known as "His Most Christian Majesty". Following the Protestant Reformation, France was riven by sectarian conflict as the Huguenots and Catholics strove for supremacy in the Wars of Religion until the 1598 Edict of Nantes established a measure of religious toleration.

=== Since the Revolution ===
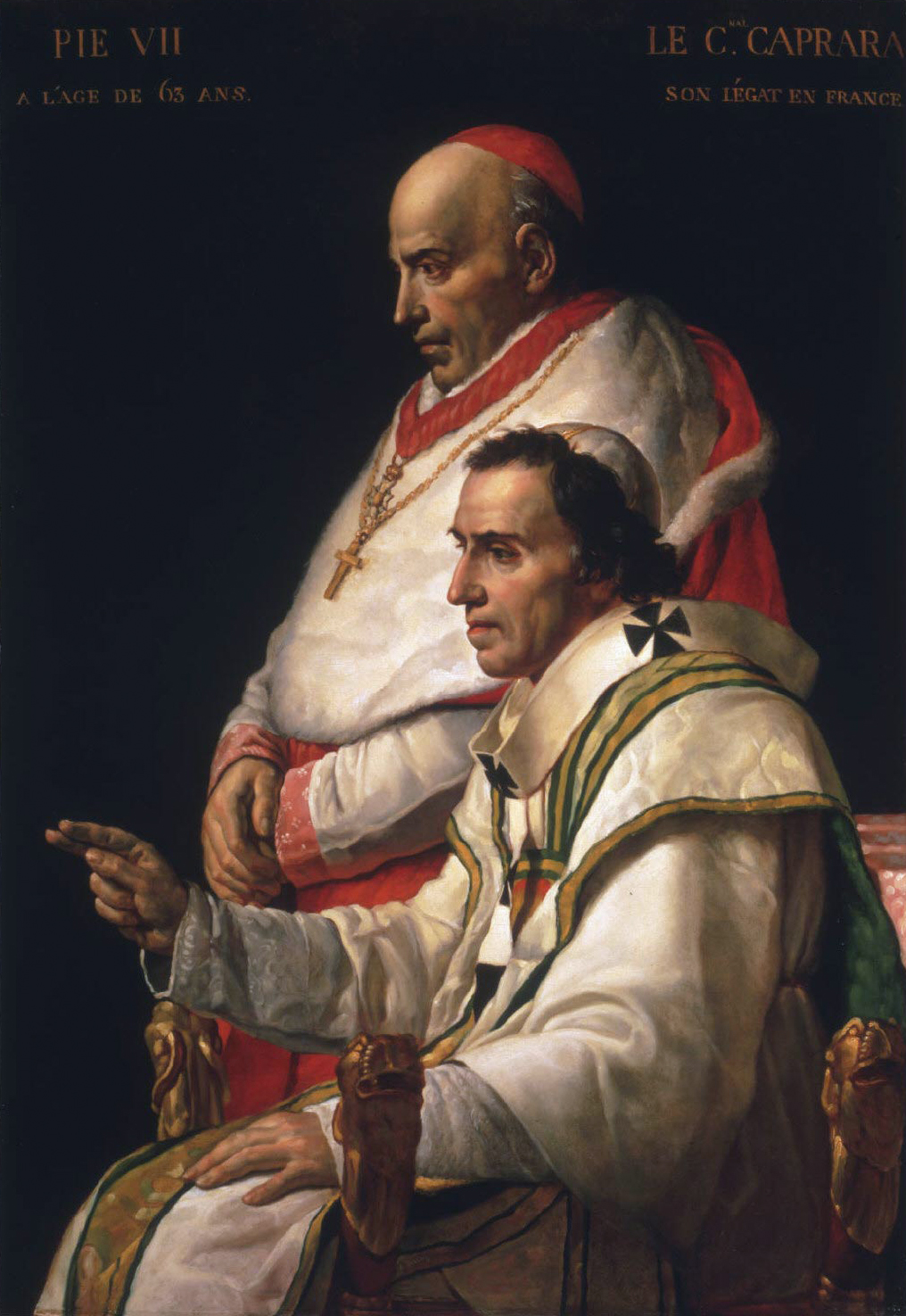
Pope Pius VII and a legate to France, Cardinal Caprara, at the Coronation of Napoleon in France. Rather than doing the coronation, the Pope is depicted merely blessing the proceedings. Detail from Jacques-Louis David's Coronation of Napoleon.

The French Revolution radically shifted power away from the Catholic Church. Church property was confiscated, and the church crop tax and special clergy privileges were eliminated. With the 1790 Civil Constitution of the Clergy, the clergy became employees of the State, and the Catholic Church became a subordinate arm of the secular French government. During the Reign of Terror, traditional Christian holidays were abolished and Catholic priests were brutally suppressed, locally through mass imprisonment and executions by drowning.

Napoleon Bonaparte negotiated a reconciliation with the Church through the 1801 Concordat, whereby the State would subsidize Catholicism (recognized as the majority religion of the French), as well as Judaism, Lutheranism, and Calvinism. After the 1814 Bourbon Restoration, the ultra-royalist government, headed by the comte de Villèle, passed the 1825 Anti-Sacrilege Act, which made stealing of consecrated Hosts punishable by death. Never enforced, this law was repealed in the July Monarchy (1830–1848).

On 5 October 2021, a report was published by the Independent Commission on Sexual Abuse in the Church (CIASE) which showed that up to 330,000 children had become victims of sexual abuse within the church in France over a period spanning 7 decades (1950–2020). This constitutes 6% of total sexual abuse in France, since the same report notes that there are a total of 5.5 million cases of sexual abuse of people under 18 in France. These crimes were committed by between 2900 and 3200 priests and community members.

== Marian apparitions ==
A number of alleged Marian apparitions are associated with France. The best known are the following:

- Our Lady of the Rosary (1206), associated with Dominic de Guzmán at Prouille
- Our Lady of Lourdes (1858), associated with Bernadette Soubirous at Lourdes
- Our Lady of La Salette (1846), associated with Maximin Giraud and Mélanie Calvat at La Salette-Fallavaux
- Our Lady of the Miraculous Medal (1830), associated with Catherine Labouré at Rue du Bac, Paris
- Our Lady of Laus (1664-1718), associated with Benoîte Rencurel at Saint-Étienne-le-Laus
- Our Lady of Pontmain (1871), associated with Joseph and Eugène Barbedette at Pontmain
- Our Lady of Pellevoisin (1876), associated with Estelle Faguette at Pellevoisin

== Organisation ==
=== Legal status ===
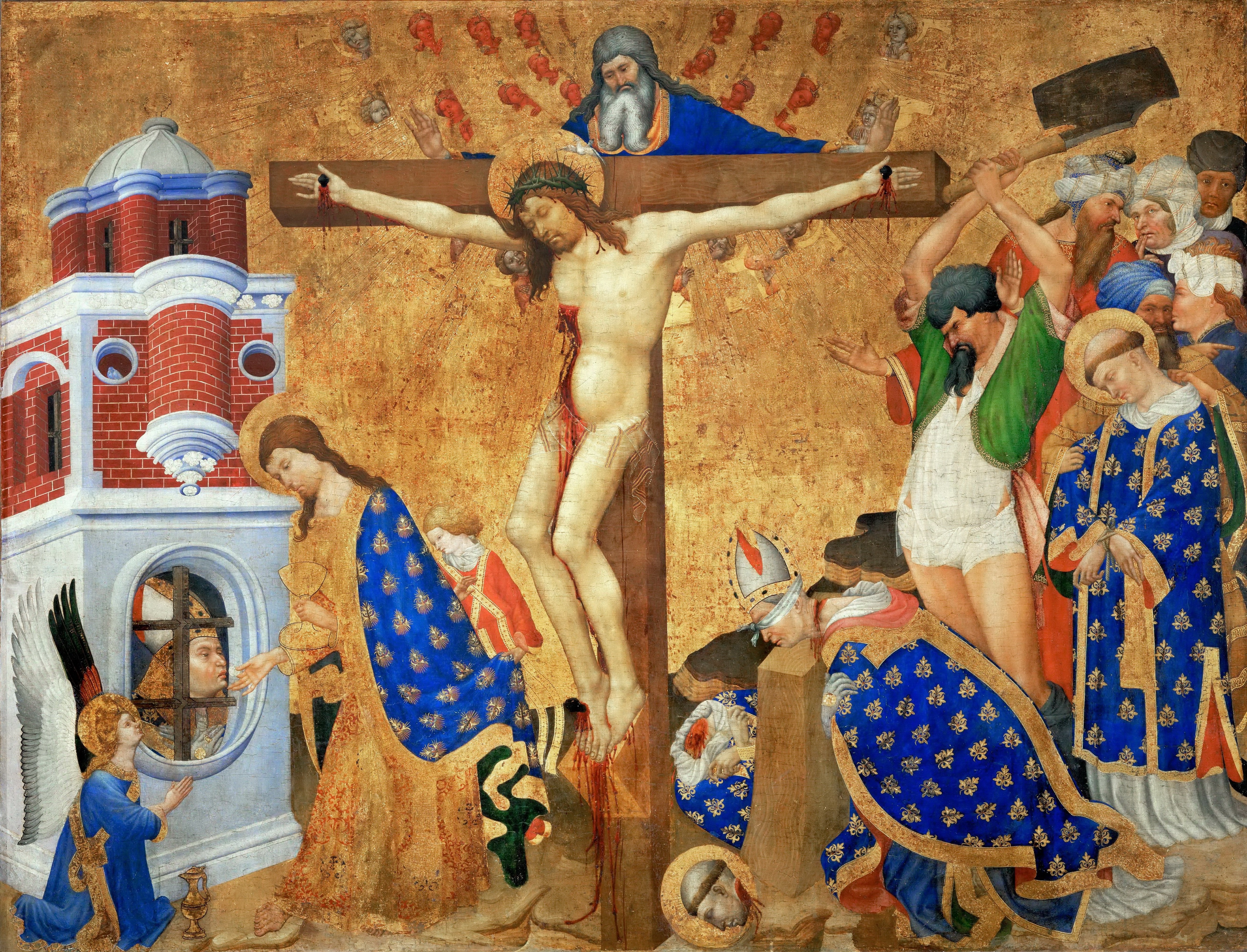
Retable de saint Denis by Henri Bellechose, c. 1416. St. Denis is the patron saint of France.

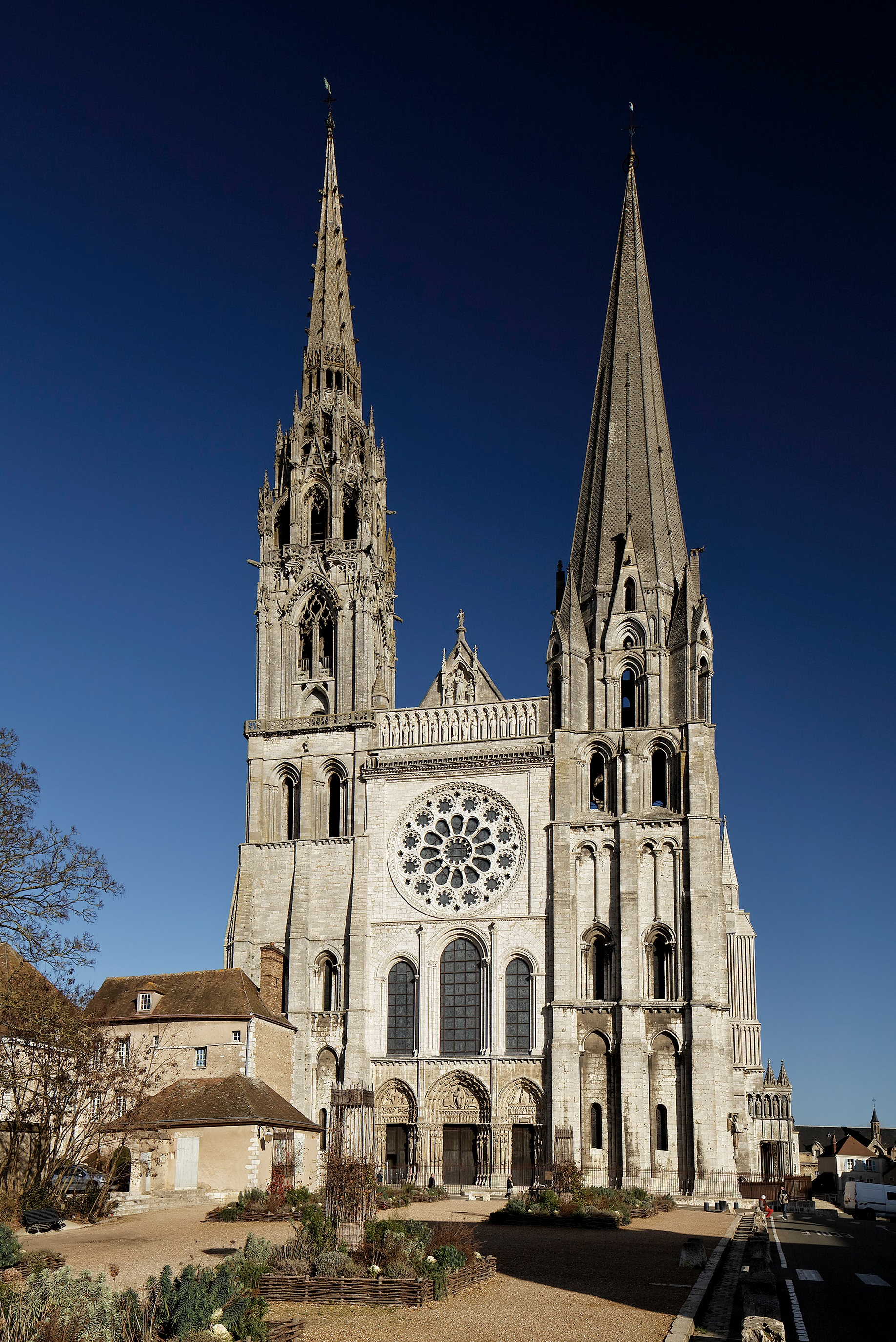
Chartres Cathedral

The 1905 French law on the separation of Church and State removed the privileged status of the state religion (Catholic Church) and of the three other state-recognised religions (Lutheranism, Calvinism, Judaism), but left to them the use without fee, and the maintenance at government expense, of the churches that they used prior to 1905.

A notable exception is Alsace-Lorraine, which at the time of the separation was part of Germany, and where the pre-1905 status, including the concordat, is still in force. This was negotiated in 1918 when Alsace-Lorraine was returned to France at the end of the First World War, and approved by both France and the Holy See with the Briand-Ceretti Agreement. As a consequence, and although France is one of the countries in the world where the state and church are most separated, the French head of state is paradoxically the only temporal power in the world still nominating Catholic bishops, namely the bishop of Metz and the archbishop of Strasbourg. They are approved by the Pope and in practice selected by him, but formally nominated by the French president following diplomatic exchanges with the Holy See through the nunciature.

During the application of the 1905 law, prime minister Emile Combes, a member of the Radical-Socialist Party, tried to strictly enforce measures which some Catholics considered humiliating or blasphematory, leading to clashes between the Congregationists and the authorities. Anti-clericalism slowly declined among the French left-wing throughout France in the twentieth century, while the question of religion and of freedom of thought seemed to have been resolved. However, it is still present as a defining trait of the left-wing, while most right-wing Frenchmen describe themselves as Catholics (although not necessarily practicing). Thus, the draft laws presented by François Mitterrand's government in the early 1980s, concerning restrictions on the state funding of private (and in majority Catholic) schools, were countered by right-wing demonstrations headed by the then mayor of Paris, the Gaullist Jacques Chirac, who was to be his prime minister in 1986 and would succeed him in 1995 as president. In the same way, the 2004 law on secularity and conspicuous religious symbols in schools, revived the controversy twenty years later, although the dividing lines also passed through each political side due to the complexity of the subject. On this occasion, several Muslim associations have allied themselves with conservative Catholics to reject the law. One consequences of the law was that some Muslim middle and high school students who refused to remove their veils or "conspicuous religious symbols" withdrew from the public school system in favour of the private, but publicly funded, Catholic schools (where the law does not apply, being restricted to the public education system).

In any case, since the 1905 law on the separation of the Church and State, the prevailing public doctrine on religion is laïcité – that is, neutrality of the state with respect to religious doctrine, and separation of the religious and the public spheres, except in Alsace-Lorraine and in some oversea territories. This state neutrality is conceived as a protection of religious minorities as well as the upholding of freedom of thought, which includes a right to agnosticism and atheism. Although many Catholics were at first opposed to this secular movement, most of them have since changed opinions, finding that this neutrality actually protects their faith from political interference. Only some minority traditionalist Catholic groups, such as the Society of St. Pius X, push for the return to the Ancien Régime or at least pre-separation situation, contending that France has forgotten its divine mission as a Christian country (an argument already upheld by the Ultras presenting the 1825 Anti-Sacrilege Act).

=== Statistics ===
2006 Statistics from the Catholic Church in France:

Source: Catholic Church
	1996	2001	2006	Change in absolute numbers 1996–2006	Change in % 1996–2006
Total baptisms	421,295	391,665	344,852	-76,443	-19.1%
Total confirmations	80,245	55,916	51,595	-28,650	-35.3%
Total Catholic marriages	124,362	118,087	89,014	-35,348	-28.4%
Total priests	27,781	24,251	20,523	-7,530	-26.1%
Total deacons	1,072	1,593	2,061	+989	+92.2%
Total nuns	Approx. 53,000	49,466	40,577	-13,000	-23.4%
Total religious institute members including monks	Approx. 15,000	Approx. 10,000	8,388	-7,000	-44%

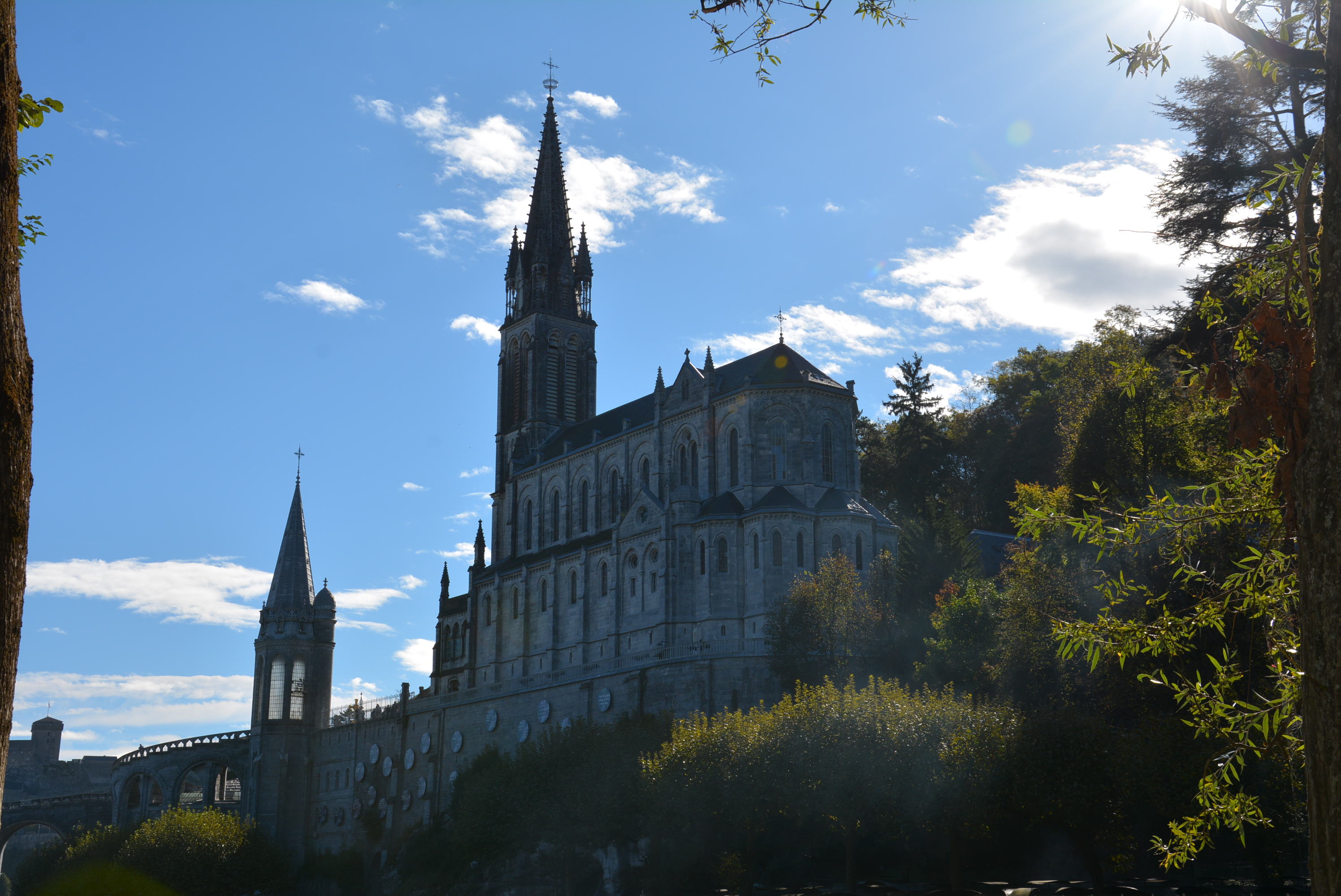
Notre-Dame de l'Immaculee-Conception, Lourdes

Of French Catholics, 74% support same-sex marriage and 24% oppose it while 87% of French Catholics believe society should accept homosexuality, while 10% believe society should not accept homosexuality.

=== Divisions ===
Dioceses of metropolitan France.

Within France the hierarchy consists of:

- Metropolitan archbishop
  - Suffragan

- Besançon
  - Belfort-Montbéliard
  - Nancy
  - Saint-Claude
  - Saint-Dié
  - Verdun
- Bordeaux
  - Agen
  - Aire sur Adour
  - Bayonne
  - Périgueux
- Clermont-Ferrand
  - Le Puy-en-Velay
  - Moulins
  - Saint-Flour
- Dijon
  - Autun
  - Nevers
  - Sens (-Auxerre)
  - Mission de France
- Lille
  - Cambrai
  - Arras (Boulogne, Saint-Omer)
- Lyon (-Vienne) (Primate) or Primate of the Gauls
  - Annecy
  - Belley-Ars
  - Chambéry
  - Grenoble
  - Saint-Etienne
  - Valence
  - Viviers
- Marseille
  - Aix-en-Provence (-Arles-Embrun)
  - Ajaccio
  - Avignon
  - Carpentras
  - Digne
  - Fréjus et Toulon
  - Gap
  - Nice
- Montpellier
  - Béziers
  - Agde
  - Carcassonne
  - Mende
  - Nîmes
  - Perpignan-Elne
- Paris
  - Créteil
  - Evry-Corbeil-Essonnes
  - Meaux
  - Nanterre
  - Pontoise
  - Saint-Denis
  - Versailles
- Poitiers
  - Angoulême
  - La Rochelle
  - Limoges
  - Tulle
- Reims
  - Amiens
  - Beauvais
  - Châlons
  - Langres
  - Soissons
  - Troyes
- Rennes
  - Angers
  - Laval
  - Le Mans
  - Luçon
  - Nantes
  - Quimper (Léon)
  - Saint-Brieuc
  - Vannes
- Rouen
  - Bayeux (-Lisieux)
  - Coutances
  - Evreux
  - Le Havre
  - Sées
- Toulouse
  - Albi
  - Auch
  - Cahors
  - Montauban
  - Pamiers
  - Rodez
  - Tarbes et Lourdes
- Tours
  - Blois
  - Bourges
  - Chartres
  - Orléans

Immediately subject to the Holy See:

- Strasbourg
- Metz
- Diocese of the French Armed Forces

Other:

- Apostolic Exarchate in France, Benelux and Switzerland for the Ukrainians
- Armenian Catholic Eparchy of Sainte-Croix-de-Paris
- Maronite Catholic Eparchy of Our Lady of Lebanon of Paris

France is the location of one of the world's major Catholic pilgrim centres at Lourdes.

== Politics ==
Growing discontent with the Catholic Church's influence in education and politics led to a series of reforms during the Third Republic reducing this influence, under the protests of the Ultramontanists who supported the Vatican's influence.

Anti-clericalism was popular among Republicans, Radicals, and Socialists, in part because the Church had supported the counterrevolutionaries throughout the 19th century. After the 16 May 1877 crisis and the fall of the Ordre Moral government led by Marshall MacMahon, the Republicans voted Jules Ferry's 1880 laws on free education (1881) and mandatory and secular education (1882), which Catholics felt was a gross violation of their rights. The 1905 French law on the Separation of the Churches and the State established state secularism in France and led to the closure of most Church-run schools.

Since the Fifth Republic, most Catholics in France have supported the Gaullist and Centrist Christian democratic parties.

=== Ownership and condition of Catholic churches in France ===
The government owns approximately 95% of France's more than 42,000 Catholic churches. This includes all parish churches constructed before 1905, which are owned by France's 34,955 communes. Only nine of the country's 149 cathedrals are not publicly owned.

The condition of these buildings varies significantly. According to the November 2024 edition of a survey by the Bishops' Conference of France, 72 churches have been demolished since 2000, and 326 have been deconsecrated since 1905. The restoration efforts following the 2019 fire at Notre Dame Cathedral have focused on the financial challenges of maintaining and restoring these historical structures, particularly the smaller churches.

== See also ==
- 1825 Anti-Sacrilege Act
- 1905 French law on the separation of Church and State
- Action Française headed by Charles Maurras
- Anti-Catholicism in France
- Briand-Ceretti Agreement
- Calvinism and French Wars of Religion
- Catholic congregations in France
- Dechristianisation of France during the French Revolution
- France-Holy See relations
- History of the Catholic Church
- Hospitalité Notre Dame de Lourdes
- List of cathedrals in France
- List of Catholic dioceses in France
- Persecution of Christians
- Protestantism in France
- Religion in France
- Secularism in France

== Notes ==
- The archbishops of these archdioceses are not metropolitan bishops and thus do not wear the pallium. These are some of the few instances in the Latin Church where this phenomenon occurs.
- This is a territorial prelature, not a diocese.
