= Order of the Apostles of the Last Days =

Roman Catholic religious order

The Order of the Apostles of the Last Days is a Roman Catholic religious order proposed by the visionary Mélanie Calvat claiming guidance from Our Lady of La Salette at a private apparition on 19 September 1846 on the mountain at La Salette, Isère in France.

== Historical account ==
During a verbal examination on October 3, 1876 Mélanie answered Abbé F. Bliard thus about the mission she had received from heaven:

This order embraces: 1. priests who will be missionaries of the Blessed Virgin Mary and the Apostles of Latter Times; 2. religious of the holy order who are subordinate to the missionaries; 3. the worldly Faithful who wish to unite themselves to and be incorporated into this work.

The goal of this religious order is to work for the sanctification of the clergy, the salvation of souls and to spread the Kingdom of God all over the world. The religious have the vocation like the missionaries to work with zeal for the salvation of souls through prayer and spiritual and corporal works of mercy.

The spirit of the order is to be that of the spirit of the first apostles. The Blessed Virgin described this spirit to me sufficiently, whether it be in the rule which she gave me or in the appeal to the Apostles of Latter Times which finished off the secret. ...

I call upon the Apostles of Last Days, the faithful disciples of Jesus Christ who have led lives in contempt of the world and of themselves, in poverty and humility, in contempt and in silence, in prayer and mortification, in chastity and in union with God, in suffering, this unknown to the world. The time has come for them to go out into the world in order to enlighten it. ...

On the 19th of September 1846 Mélanie had a vision:

I saw the Apostles of Last Days in the habit of their order.” They are very similar to the habits of priests at that time. “On one end of the belt there were seen three letters in red: M.P.J. (Mourir Pour Jésus – to die for Jesus). On the other end of the belt there were three letters in blue: E.D.M. (Enfant de Marie – Mary’s child).”

== Establishments ==
There have been a number of attempts over time to establish the religious orders Mélanie failed to establish herself.

A first attempt was made by Blessed Giacomo Cusmano in Italy with the foundation of the congregations of the Missionary Servants of the Poor and of the Sister Servants of the Poor, its female equivalent. It was assisted by Mélanie herself and exists today.

A second attempt was made by Blessed Annibale Maria di Francia R.C.J. in Italy also, with the foundation of the congregations of the Rogationists of the Heart of Jesus and with its female counterpart the Daughters of Divine Zeal. This attempt was also assisted by Mélanie during her life, and exists today.

A further, continuous, attempt was made in the first half of the twentieth century in small ecclesiastical communities in Western Europe;

- in Maranville and Renneport (Haute-Marne), France, around 1885 started by Germaine Blanchard;
- in Tournai (diocese of Tournai), Belgium, around 1901
- in Leuven (archdiocese of Mechelen-Brussels, Belgium, around 1919-1922 started by canon Armand Thiéry, Bertha Isabelle Carton de Wiart and Marie de Foy Colette with the support of Désiré Cardinal Mercier.
- in Saint-Lambert-du-Lattay (Diocese of Angers), France, around 1929 started by the religious named Mother Saint-Jean and supported by father Paul Gouin;
- in Gembloux (Diocese of Namur), Belgium, around 1935
- in Paris (archdiocese of Paris), France, around 1941
- in Gargenville (diocese of Versailles), France, around 1942
- in Bray-et-Lû (diocese of Versailles), France, around 1943
- in ... (diocese of Le Mans), France, around 194...
- in Paris (archdiocese of Paris), France, around 1947

Recent attempts in the 1970s and 1980s were made in Mérida, Mexico; and Canada, France and Haïti by Father Gaston Hurtubise; and very recently the lay community of the Frères de Saint Jean in France.

== See also ==
- Saint Louis Marie Grignon de Montfort

== Bibliography ==
- Gouin, Paul, Sœur Marie de la Croix. Bergère de la Salette. Née Mélanie Calvat. Tertiaire de St Dominique. Victime de Jésus, Éditions Saint-Michel, Saint-Céneré, 1969
- Dion, Henry, Mélanie Calvat bergère de a Salette: Etapes humaines et mystiques, Éditions Pierre Téqui, Paris, 1984 ISBN 2-85244-658-8
- Smeyers, Maurits, Armand Thiéry (Gentbrugge 1868 - Leuven 1955): apologie voor een geniaal zonderling, Arca Lovaniensis artes atque historiae reserans documenta: jaarboek 19-20, Vrienden van de Leuvense stedelijke musea, Leuven, 1992
- Laurentin, René & Corteville M.S., Michel, Découverte du secret de la Salette, Éditions Fayard, Paris, 2002 ISBN ...
