= France–Holy See relations =

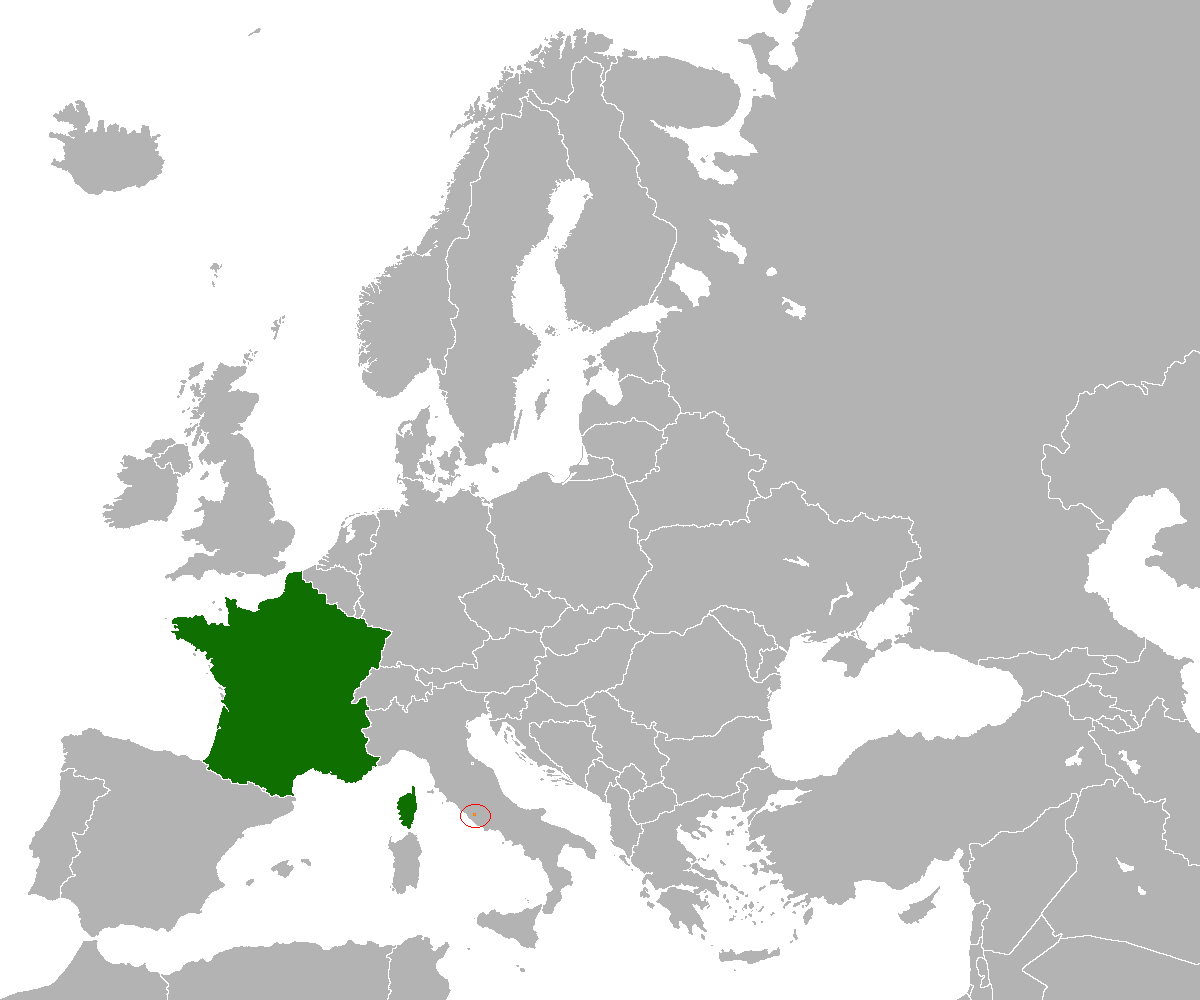
- France: Holy See

France–Holy See relations are very ancient and have existed since the 5th century. They have been durable to the extent that France is sometimes called the eldest daughter of the Church (fille aînée de l'Église in French).

Areas of cooperation between Paris and the Holy See have traditionally included education, health care, the struggle against poverty and international diplomacy. Before the establishment of the welfare state, Church involvement was evident in many sectors of French society. Today, Paris's international peace initiatives are often in line with those of the Holy See, which favors dialogue on a global level.

== Early Middle Ages ==
The first Council of Orléans officially sealed a long-lasting alliance between the papacy and the monarchy. The Carolingians strongly enforced these laws for centuries, but they often took it to themselves to name bishops and control church activities.

== Late Middle Ages ==
The Gregorian reform was successfully imposed on France. Boniface VIII had a bitter dispute with Philip the Fair over the temporal power of the pope. These divisions eventually led to the Western Schism, which was only resolved after the end of the Avignon papacy. Unresolved controversies from that schismatic period led to the wars of religion, in which the Catholic side ultimately prevailed in France.

== 16th-17th century ==
Gallicanism played a major role in the period following the Council of Trent. The kings of France had a near monopoly on the nomination of bishops and it was difficult to apply all the decisions of Trent because of this. Louis XIV was a major patron of the church and was generally opposed to granting privileges to Protestants.

== 18th century ==
Disputes between jesuits and jansenists had pope Clement XI intervene in church affairs with the bull Unigenitus of 1713 in order to resolve controversies over grace.

The bull In eminenti apostolatus banning Freemasonry is promulgated by pope Clement XII in 1738, but it was deliberately ignored by the French parliament, which went on to adopt the social program of the Enlightenment.

Pope Pius VI notoriously opposed the Civil Constitution of the Clergy, a turning point in the French Revolution which led to bloody infighting between revolutionaries and reactionaries.

== 19th century ==
The Concordat of 1801 was a reflection of an agreement between Napoleon Bonaparte and Pope Pius VII that reaffirmed the Roman Catholic Church as the majority church of France and restored some of its former civil status.

After Napoleon's defeat, the Papacy approved of the neo-royalist Restoration and opposed the Carbonaris and other secret societies. The revolutions of 1848 had a largely negative impact on relations between the two States, and Pius IX publicly deplored them.

Following the British Empire's defeat of China in the First Opium War (1839-1841), China was required to permit foreign missionaries. The unequal treaties gave European powers jurisdiction over missions and some authority over Chinese Christians. France sought to frame itself as the protector of Catholics in China, which in turn led to a sustained diplomatic dispute with the Holy See about who had authority over Chinese Catholics.

After Pius IX's death in 1878, relations became sour between secularists and Catholics who were mostly monarchists, but pope Leo XIII did his best to reconcile the two opposite factions in French society, in what historians have called the ralliement by recognising the republic.

== 20th century ==
The early 20th century was a very difficult time in France-Vatican relations because of tensions over church-state separation (laicité) and anticlericalism, which were condemned by Pius X, and which led to the freezing of relations. Diplomatic relations were broken by the French government in 1904.

In 1917, France blocked the Holy See's efforts to establish diplomatic relations with the Republic of China. As a result, Vatican interests in China were represented by an Apostolic Delegate (which does not have formal diplomatic status) until the 1940s.

Relations between France and the Holy See were renewed after the First World War in 1921 and had very much improved under the presidency of Charles de Gaulle. There was controversy over relations under the Vichy regime, because the regime rewarded the Church even though bishops often opposed antisemitism.

Although Giscard D'Estaing had been considered as a conservative Catholic (he was from the Union for French Democracy (UDF), which was a centre-right Christian democratic party), it was under his conservative government that laws on abortion and contraception were legalised.

Relations with the François Mitterrand's Socialist government were also chilly because the Socialist government planned to further secularize private schools (defunded the schools which run by the Catholic Church) and functionaries, massive demonstrations making it change its mind. John Paul II deplored the dechristianization of France; in one of his pilgrimages, he famously said, "France, what have you done of your baptism?"

== 21st century ==
Relations with the Nicolas Sarkozy's conservative gaullist government had been relatively good, given the fact that the government announced an end to the ban on recognition of higher Christian institutions.

Relations with the François Hollande's socialist government with Vatican had been strained, due to the Socialist government legalized same-sex marriage in 2013. However, President François Hollande had a good relationship with Pope Francis.

== Resident diplomatic missions ==
- France has an embassy to the Holy See in Rome.
- Holy See has an Apostolic nunciature in Paris.
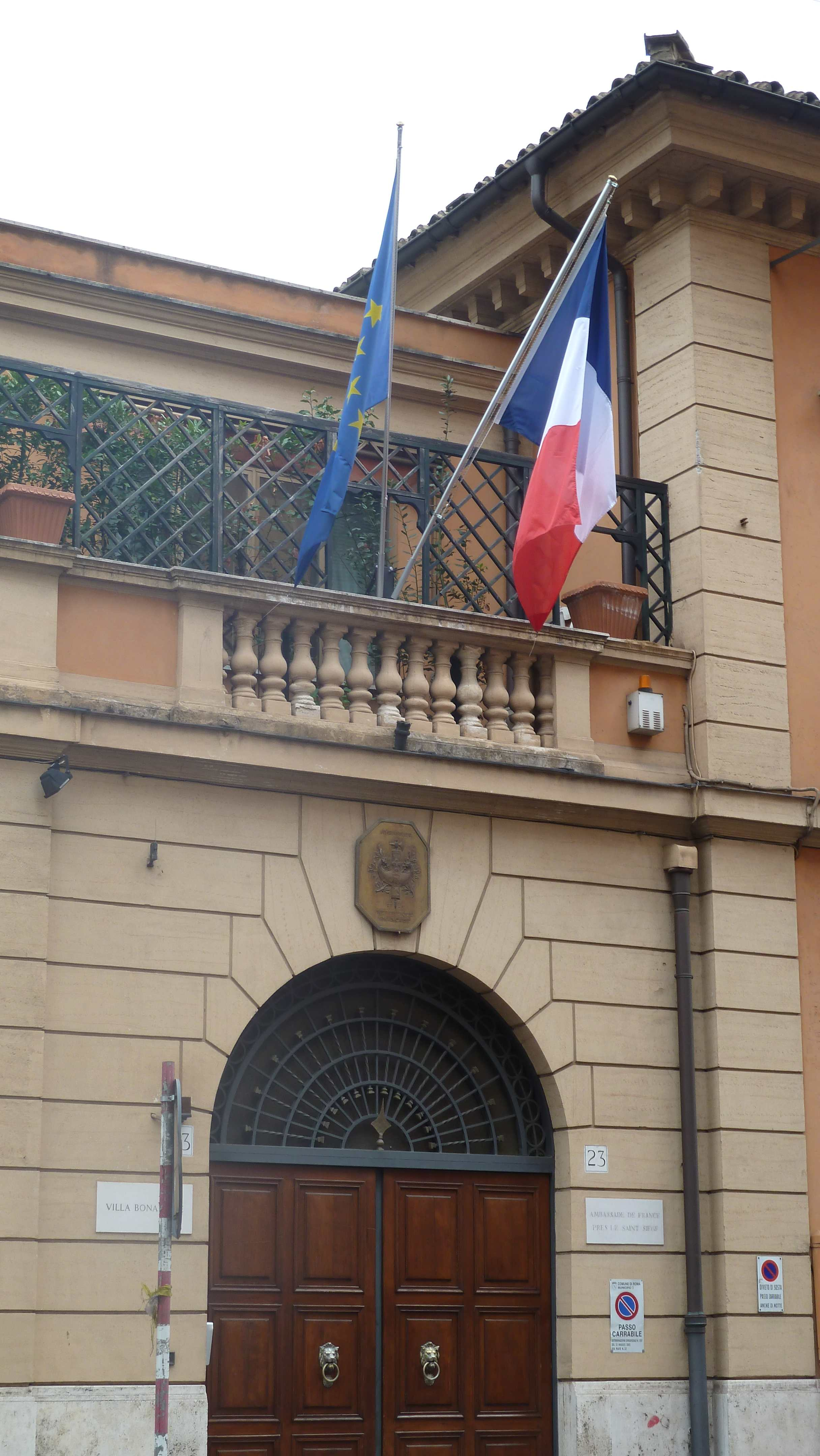
Embassy of France to the Holy See in Rome

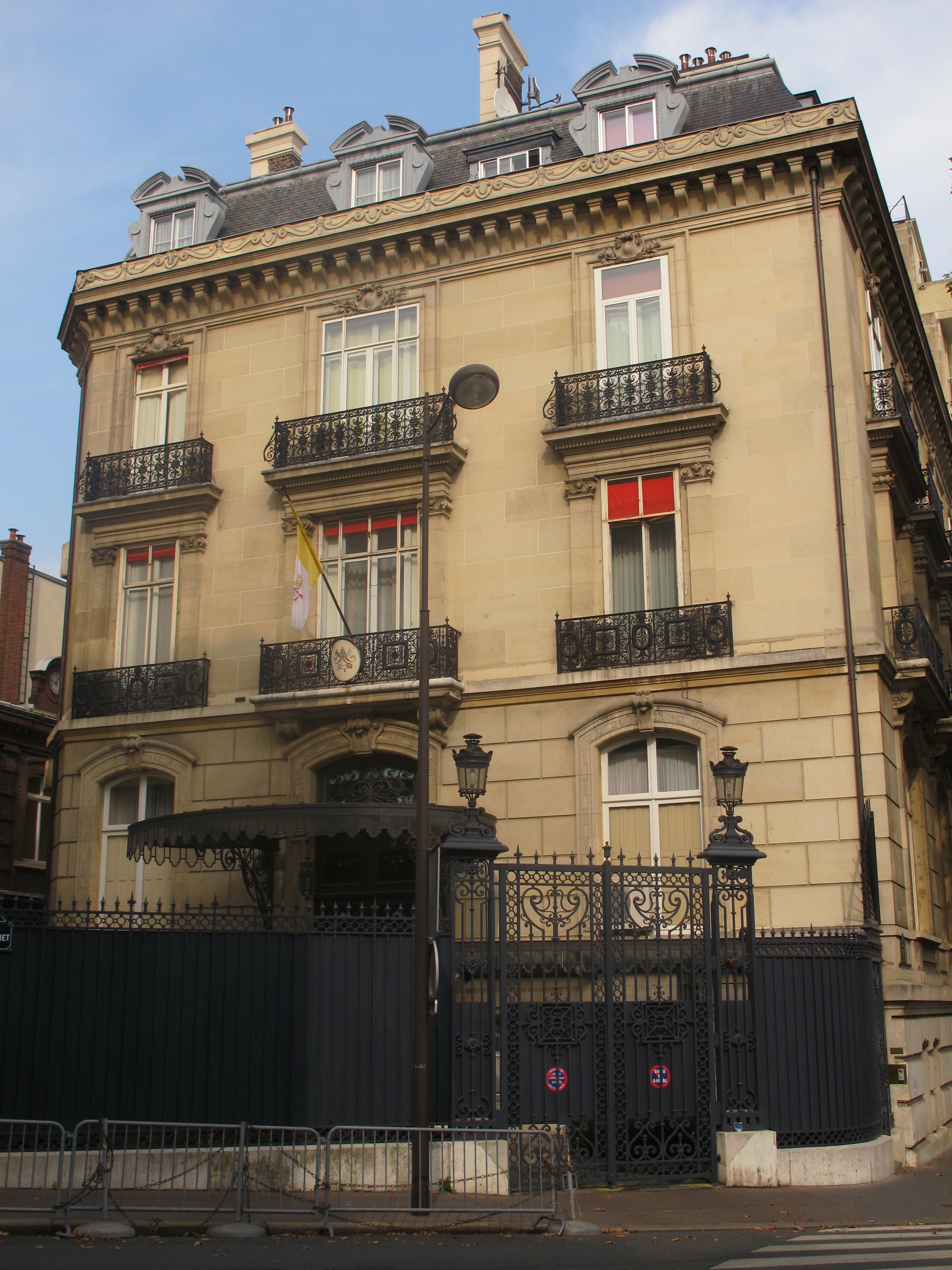
Apostolic nunciature of the Holy See in Paris

== See also ==
- Apostolic Nunciature to France
- Briand-Ceretti Agreement
- Pious Establishments of France
