= Corps, Isère =

Corps
- Commune
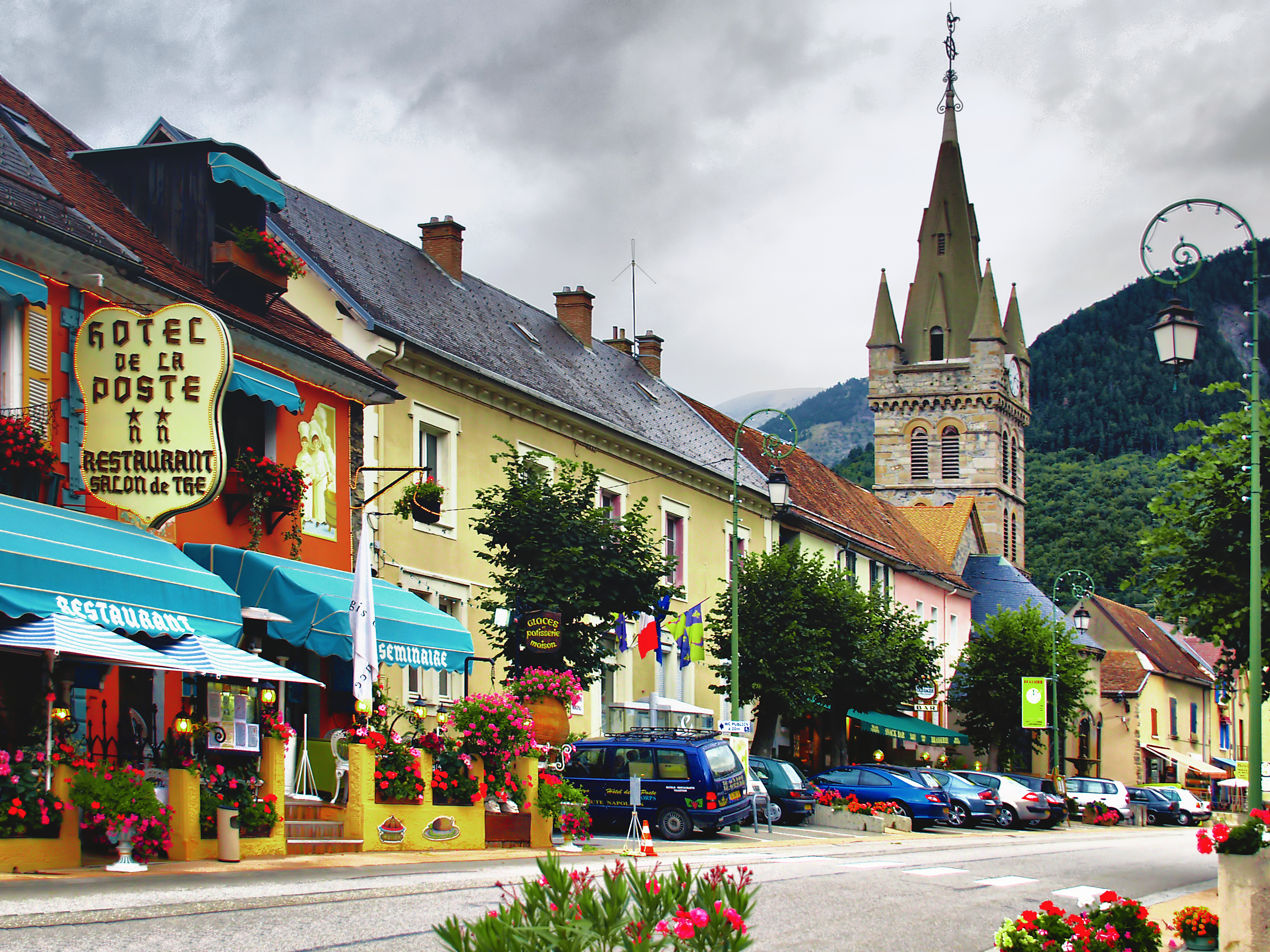
- The Rue des Fossés in Corps

- Coat of arms
- Location of Corps
- Location within France Location within Auvergne-Rhône-Alpes
- Coordinates: 44°49′10″N 5°56′51″E
- Country: France
- Region: Auvergne-Rhône-Alpes
- Department: Isère
- Arrondissement: Grenoble
- Canton: Matheysine-Trièves

Government
  - Mayor (2020–2026): Fabien Mulyk
- Area^{1}: 11 km^{2} (4.2 sq mi)
- Elevation: 937 m (3,074 ft)
- Highest elevation: 1,840 m (6,040 ft)
- Lowest elevation: 639 m (2,096 ft)
- Population (2023): 421
  - Density: 38/km^{2} (99/sq mi)
- Time zone: UTC+01:00 (CET)
  - Summer (DST): UTC+02:00 (CEST)
- INSEE/Postal code: 38128 /38970
- ^{1} French Land Register data, which excludes lakes, ponds, glaciers > 1 km^{2} (0.386 sq mi or 247 acres) and river estuaries.

Corps (French pronunciation: [kɔʁ]) is a commune in the department of Isère in southeastern France.

== Geography ==
Corps is a small town in the south of France. Located in the Beaumont region in the Southern Alps, on the borders on the frontier between the départments of Isère and Hautes-Alpes. It is located 40 km north of Gap, 65 km south of Grenoble and 220 km to the north of Marseille.

The village of Corps is surrounded by high mountains, including the Obiou in the Dévoluy massif which overlooks the magnificent Sautet lake.

The village is at the start of the road which leads to the Marian Sanctuary of La Salette, place of pilgrimage where Our Lady of La Salette would have appeared to two small shepherds from Corps, Mélanie Calvat and Maximin Giraud.

== Population ==
Historical population
Year	Pop.	±% p.a.
1968	556	—
1975	465	−2.52%
1982	505	+1.19%
1990	512	+0.17%
1999	453	−1.35%
2007	456	+0.08%
2012	517	+2.54%
2017	486	−1.23%
2023	421	−2.36%
Source: INSEE

Its inhabitants are called the Corpatus in French.

== Twin towns ==
Corps is twinned with:

- Plouëc-du-Trieux, France

== See also ==
- Our Lady of La Salette
- Mélanie Calvat
- Maximin Giraud
- Route Napoléon
- Communes of the Isère department
