= Maximin Giraud =

French Marian visionary

- Born: 26 August 1835; Corps en Isère, Kingdom of France
- Died: 1 March 1875 (aged 39); Corps en Isère, France
- Known for: Visionary of Our Lady of La Salette

Pierre Maximin Giraud (26 August 1835 – 1 March 1875) was a French man known for his Marian vision of Our Lady of La Salette.

== Early life ==
Maximin Giraud was born on 26 August 1835, in Corps, Isère. His mother, Anne-Marie Templier hailed from the same region. His father, Germain Giraud was from the neighboring district of Trièves. The mother died leaving Maximin, then 17 months old, and a daughter, Angélique, who was eight years of age. Shortly after, Germain Giraud, a wheelwright by trade, remarried Marie Court. His new wife was reportedly not interested in Maximin and even neglected the child. Maximin grew up in haphazard fashion, spending much of his time with carefree abandon in the sole company of his dog and goat as they roamed the streets of Corps en Isère. Attendance at school was not compulsory and so he never attended classes. The same was true with regard to religious instructions.

Giraud spoke the Vivaro-Alpine (Dauphinois) dialect of the Occitan language, like everybody else in town, but he learned a few words of French as he circulated among the wagon-drivers and travelers at the stage coach relays. He was 11 years old in 1846.

== Marian apparition ==
On 19 September 1846, about three o'clock in the afternoon, on a mountain about three miles distant from the village of La Salette-Fallavaux, it is related that two children, a shepherdess of fifteen named Mélanie Calvat, called Mathieu, and a shepherd-boy of eleven named Maximin Giraud, both of them uneducated, beheld in a resplendent light a "beautiful lady" clad in a strange costume. Speaking alternately in French and in patois, she passed a message which they were "to deliver to all her people". After complaining of the impiety of Christians, and threatening them with dreadful chastisements in case they should persevere in evil, she promised them the Divine mercy if they would amend. The lady also said something in secret to each of the children. As she spoke to each in turn, the other could see her lips move, but could not hear what she said.

The apparition was approved by Mgr. Philibert de Bruillard, Bishop of Grenoble 16 November 1851 under the title of Our Lady of La Salette. Both secrets were written down by the visionaries and sent to the pope in the same year.

=== Maximin's secret ===
On September 19, 1846, we saw a beautiful Lady. We never said that this lady was the Blessed Virgin but we always said that it was a beautiful Lady. I do not know if it is the Blessed Virgin or another person. As for me, I believe today that it is the Blessed Virgin. Here is what this Lady said to me:

"If my people continue, what I will say to you will arrive earlier, if it changes a little, it will be a little later. France has corrupted the universe, one day it will be punished. The faith will die out in France: three quarters of France will not practice religion anymore, or almost no more, the other part will practice it without really practicing it. Then, after [that], nations will convert, the faith will be rekindled everywhere.

A great country in the north of Europe, now Protestant, will be converted; by the support of this country all the other nations of the world will be converted. Before all that arrives, great disorders will arrive, in the Church, and everywhere. Then, after [that], our Holy Father the Pope will be persecuted. His successor will be a pontiff that nobody expects.

Then, after [that], a great peace will come, but it will not last a long time. A monster will come to disturb it. All that I tell you here will arrive in the other century, at the latest in the year two thousand."

Maximin Giraud (She told me to say it some time before.)

My Most Holy Father, your holy blessing to one of your sheep.

Grenoble, July 3, 1851.

The edition of 3 July 1851 was reproduced on request of Benjamin Dausse, a friend and trustee of Maximin. A second edition followed on 11 August 1851. A third edition was produced on 5 August 1853 at the request of Jacques-Marie-Achille Ginoulhiac, the new bishop of Grenoble, who was unacquainted with the secret.

=== Interpretation ===
Sociologist Michael P. Carroll hypothesizes that the apparition may have grown out of an initial hallucination, shaped by an unconscious desire on the part of Maximin to punish his step-mother for mistreating him. Indications that Maximin may have on occasion gone hungry would be reflected in the predicted punishments relating to famine. Both Melanie's and Maximin's initial impression of the weeping woman was that of a possible victim of domestic violence. In one interview, Maximin said that he thought of a woman "whose son had beaten her and then left her".

== Life after the apparition ==
During the three years following the apparition, his half-brother Jean-François, his stepmother and his father died. His mother's brother, called oncle Templier, became Maximin's guardian. After the apparition, he was placed as a boarder in the Sisters of Providence School in Corps en Isère, where an inquiry concerning the apparition took place. His progress in school was slow, hampered by constant pressure from pilgrims and other curious people. The children never contradicted the story of the apparition, despite being interrogated separately. Giraud went to Ars to meet Saint Jean Baptiste Marie Vianney three times, and was questioned by him about the apparitions. Giraud reportedly did not enjoy the visit but did enjoy the ride and the chance to see new sights. Due to the malice of an assistant priest of Vianney, a misunderstanding arose, which only after eight years was resolved and the Curé once again confirmed his belief in the apparitions.

Afterwards, Maximin moved from place to place. He entered the Minor Seminary of Rondeau in Grenoble, afterwards moving to the abbey of the Grande Chartreuse. From there, he travelled to Seyssin, and then to Rome, and thence to Dax, Aire-sur-l'Adour and Le Vésinet, then to Tonnerre, to Jouy-en-Josas near Versailles, and finally Paris. Maximin tried his vocation as a seminarian, and after that, he worked as a nursing-home employee and a medical student. Failing the state examinations, he went to work in a pharmacy.

In 1865, the Marquise de Pignerolles gave him a trip to Rome, where in April, Maximin enlisted as member of the Corps of Papal Zouaves, who were responsible for the defense of the Papal States and the protection of the Pope. Because of his time at the Paris Medical School, in 1862 he was assigned to the Health Service as a nurse. His time in the Zouaves combined a religious element, with his interest in the military, and his medical training, in an atmosphere of camaraderie. While there, he worked on his memoirs, an account requested by Madame Jourdain. In his subsequent writings, Giraud noted with pride his service with the Zouaves. Giraud saw no major battles and after his enlistment ended, he returned to Paris.

The newspaper La Vie Parisienne published an attack on la Salette and the two children. Giraud protested and the newspaper printed a correction. In reaction towards this, in 1866 he published a short work called Ma profession de foi sur l'apparition de Notre-Dame de La Salette.

It was during this time that the Jourdain family, a couple devoted to him, brought a measure of stability into his life, and, at financial risk to themselves, cleared his debts. In 1869, Giraud then entered into a partnership with a liquor dealer who used his now-famous name to increase sales. Giraud was fraudulently abused by him and failed to profit from the association.

In 1870 he was drafted by the Imperial Army and assigned to Fort Barrau in Grenoble. Following this he returned to Corps and was joined there by the Jourdains. The three were poor but were helped by the fathers of the shrine with the approval of the bishop. In November 1874 Giraud made a pilgrimage to the shrine. In the presence of an audience, he repeated the story of La Salette as he had done on the very first day. This would be the last time he would do so. In February 1875 he visited the parish church, also for the last time.

== Death ==
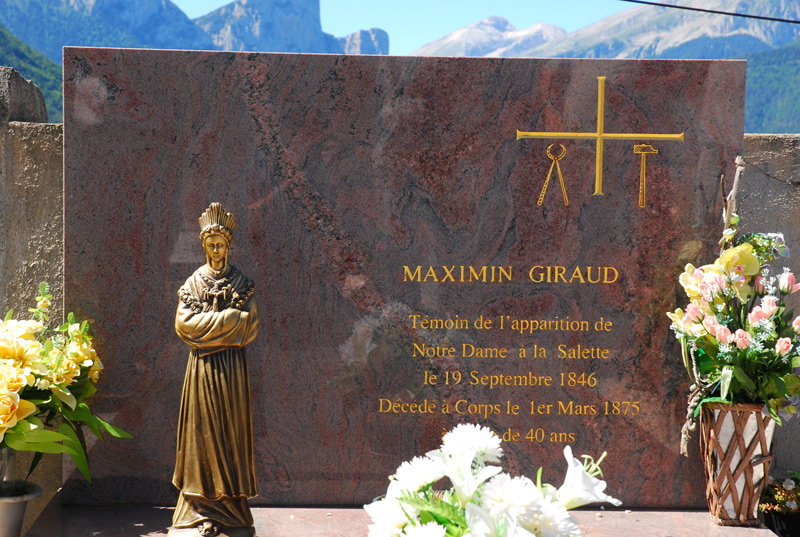
Grave of Maximin Giraud, Corps

On the evening of 1 March 1875, Giraud was given Last Rites: he made his final Confession and received Viaticum, drinking La Salette holy water to help swallow the Host. Shortly thereafter he died, not yet 40.

Giraud was buried in the cemetery of Corps. He wanted to underscore once again his love for La Salette and solemnly proclaimed:

I believe firmly, even to the shedding of my blood, in the famous apparition of the most Blessed Virgin on the holy mountain of La Salette, on 19 September 1846, the apparition that I have defended in word and suffering. ... It is with this spirit that I give my heart to Our Lady of La Salette.

== See also ==
- Our Lady of La Salette
- Mélanie Calvat

== Bibliography ==
- Bert, Michael, James Costa. 2010. "Linguistic borders, language revitalisation and the imagining of new regional entities", Borders and Identities (Newcastle upon Tyne, 8–9 January 2010), 18.
- (in French) Rousselot, Pierre Joseph. 1848. La verité sur l'événement de La Salette du 19 September 1846 ou rapport à Mgr l'évêque de Grenoble sur l'apparition de la Sainte Vierge à deux petits bergers sur la montagne de La Salette, canton de Corps (Isère). Grenoble: Baratier.
- (in French) Rousselot, Pierre Joseph. 1850. Nouveaux documents. Grenoble: Baratier.
- (in French) Rousselot, Pierre Joseph. 1853. Un nouveau Sanctuaire à Marie, ou Conclusion de l'affaire de La Salette. Grenoble: Baratier.
- (in French) Giraud, Maximin. 1866. Ma profession de foi sur l'apparition de Notre-Dame de La Salette. (1st edition.) Paris: Charpentier.
- (in French) Giraud, Maximin. [1866] 1870. Ma profession de foi sur l'apparition de Notre-Dame de La Salette. (Reprint.) Paris: Charpentier.
- (in French) Giraud, Maximin. [1866] 1873. Ma profession de foi sur l'apparition de Notre-Dame de La Salette. (Reprint.) Paris: Charpentier.
- (in French) Roullet, Hervé, L'apparition de la Vierge Marie à La Salette. Marie réconciliatrice. Les vies de Mélanie Calvat et Maximin Giraud. Actualité des secrets, Roullet Hervé, Dif. AVM, Paris, 2021. See in particular Chapters II, XII and XIII.
