= Briand-Ceretti Agreement =

1926 agreement between France and the Vatican

The Briand-Cerretti Agreement is a 1926 agreement whereby French diocesan bishops are nominated by the Vatican after a process involving the French Ministries of the Interior and of Foreign Affairs.

== Description ==
This agreement saw the resolution of an impasse whereby the Vatican had refused to recognise the Associations Culturelles created by the 1905 French law on the Separation of the Churches and the State extending the 1901 French law on associations; these laws had been accepted by the Jewish and Protestant religious bodies. The agreement made possible the forming of Associations Diocésaines with members appointed by the bishops.

In the case of the Concordat dioceses of Strasbourg and Metz it has remained the French President who, after consultations with the Vatican, makes the appointments of diocesan bishops, which are published in the Journal officiel de la République Française.

The Briand-Cerretti agreement came after the forced retirement of the Benedictine bishop of Metz, Willibrord Benzler, in 1919 and only provides a very vague analogy for the depositions at the Liberation of France.

Among the many consequences of this agreement was the reluctance to appoint ordinaries likely to call into question the spoliations and expropriations that the French church underwent between 1790 and 1905. The veto has been rarely used but its existence induces caution in nunciature circles when proposing candidates. Disagreements are known from time to time to occur, as mentioned by the former ambassador to the Vatican, Jean Guégenou, on France-Culture on 13 July 2009. The system also indirectly ensures that, almost without exception, French citizens alone are employed in Catholic administration and schools in France.

The 1926 agreement also involved the maintenance of liturgical honours, such as seating and incensing, paid to French consular personnel in the former Ottoman territories, as at the Consulate General of France in Jerusalem.

== See also ==
- Concordat of 1801
- Catholic Church in France
- French legislation for the prevention and repression of cultic groups
- Gallicanism
