= Our Lady of La Salette =

1846 Marian apparition in France

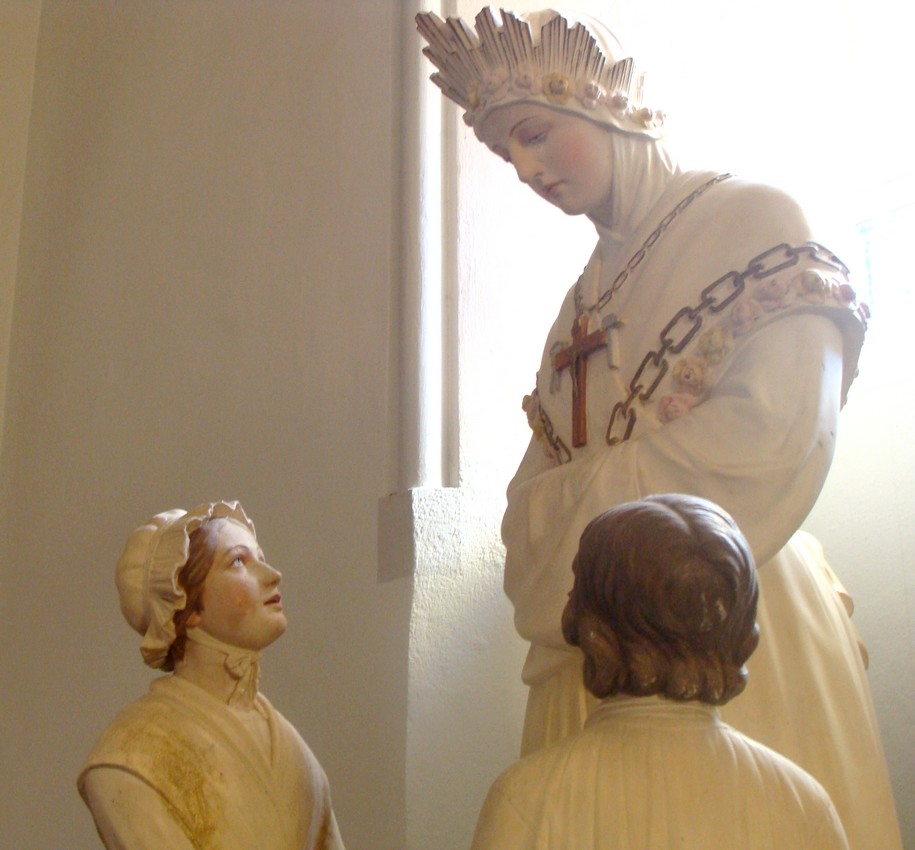
- Location: La Salette-Fallavaux, France
- Date: 19 September 1846
- Witness: Mélanie Calvat; Maximin Giraud
- Type: Marian apparition
- Approval: 19 September 1851; Bishop Philibert de Bruillard; Diocese of Grenoble
- Shrine: Sanctuary of Our Lady of La Salette, La Salette, France
- Patronage: La Salette-Fallavaux, Silang, Cavite

Our Lady of La Salette (French: Notre-Dame de La Salette) is a Marian apparition reported by two French children, Maximin Giraud and Mélanie Calvat, to have occurred at La Salette-Fallavaux, France, in 1846.

On 19 September 1851, the local bishop formally approved the public devotion and prayers to Our Lady of La Salette. On 21 August 1879, Pope Leo XIII granted a canonical coronation to the image now located within the Basilica of Our Lady of La Salette. A Russian-style tiara was granted to the image, instead of the solar-type tiara used in the traditional depictions of Our Lady during her apparitions.

Places dedicated to Our Lady of La Salette outside of France include a sanctuary in Oliveira de Azeméis, Portugal; a sanctuary in Gdańsk, Poland; a chapel in San Miguel de Allende, Guanajuato, Mexico; a shrine in Kodaikanal, Tamilnadu, India; as well as a national shrine in Attleboro, Massachusetts, and a shrine in Enfield, New Hampshire, in the United States, known for their displays of Christmas lights. There is a national shrine of Our Lady of La Salette at Kayakunnu, Nadavayal, in Wayanad, Kerala, India run by Missionaries of Our Lady of La Salette.

== Background ==
In 1846, the village of La Salette consisted of eight or nine scattered hamlets. The population was about 800, principally small farmers with their families and dependents.

== The apparition ==
On Saturday 19 September 1846, around 3 p.m., two young shepherds, Mélanie Calvat (or Mélanie Mathieu), aged just under 15, and Maximin Giraud (sometimes called Mémin, and, by mistake, Germain), 11 years old, guarded their herds on a mountain near the village of La Salette-Fallavaux (department of Isère). On the evening, they said to their masters that they had seen a lady in tears who had spoken to them. Widow Pra (also known as widow Caron), mistress of Mélanie, believed that they had seen the Blessed Virgin and the children were urged to report everything to the priest of La Salette. They did so the next day. The priest wept with emotion, took notes and, again in tears, described what had been told to him, in his sermon.

== The Pra report ==
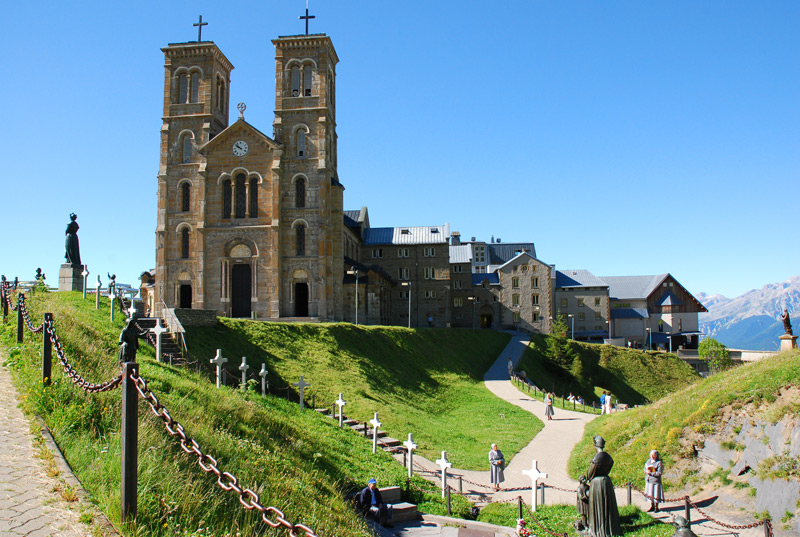
Basilica of Our Lady of La Salette

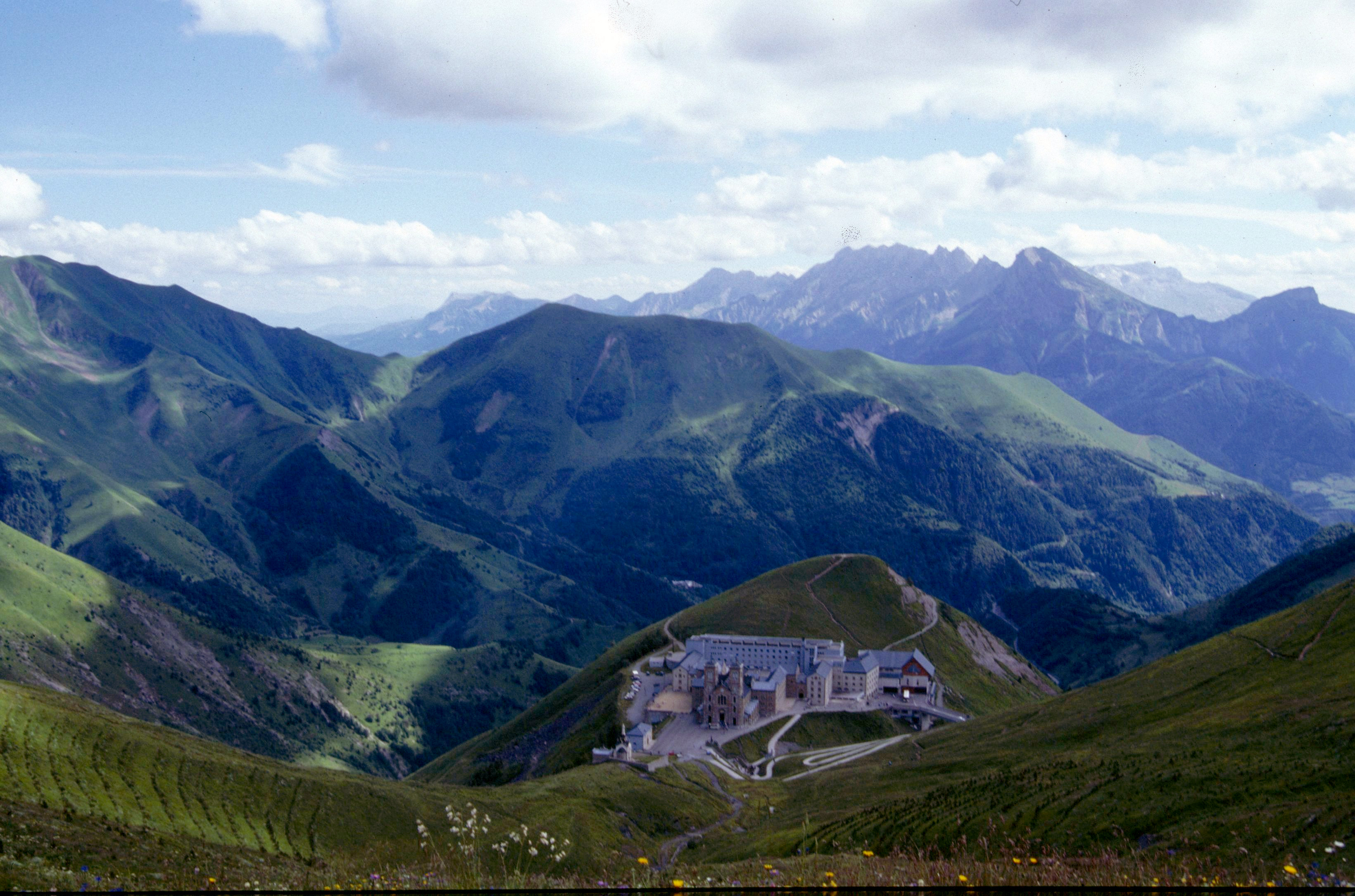
The Marian Shrine of Our Lady in the great mountain of La Salette

On Sunday evening, in the presence of Mélanie but in the absence of Maximin, whom his master had taken back to his family in Corps, Baptiste Pra (Mélanie's master), Pierre Selme (Maximin's master) and a certain Jean Moussier collaborated to put in writing the words addressed by the Virgin to the children. The resulting document, which is called the "Pra report", is now only known from a copy made by an investigator, Abbé Lagier, in February 1847. Nevertheless, this copy agrees with earlier documents which surely derive from the original Pra report.

According to later reports, the words "I will tell you otherwise" mean that the Virgin, who had first spoken in French, began to speak in the patois of Corps. From 12 October 1846 the documents mention that during the apparition, the lady confided a personal secret to each of the two children.

For Father Stern, the Pra report is of prime importance among the documents on the apparition.

== Process of harmonization between the testimonies of the two children ==
The Pra report was written in the presence of Mélanie and in the absence of Maximin. Father Stern, however, considers it possible that the writers of the report added to Mélanie's statements things that had been said by Maximin.

Each of the two seers had, in the first weeks, a part of the lady's message of which they were more sure than the other seer. The parish priest of La Salette noted on 16 October 1846: "All this story" (that is to say, essentially, what concerns the complaints, threats and promises of the Virgin) "is faithfully given by little Mélanie and although little Germain could not in principle give it with the same order, he always said, however, when hearing his little companion tell it, that it was indeed that. What follows" (that is to say, essentially, the account of the Coin incident, which features Maximin and his father) "was more particularly understood and remembered by little Germain, Mélanie admitting that it is certain that the lady spoke to the little boy without Mélanie being able to understand the lady."

However, in the words of Father Stern, a "process of harmonization" between the statements of the two children resulted in the fixation of the "Salettine vulgate": "The way he (Maximin) presents the words of the Lady [...] in February–March 1847 certainly owes something to the stories he heard from Mélanie in the meantime. But an influence in the opposite direction, from Maximin to Mélanie, must also have existed."

== Episcopal inquiries ==
The story of Mélanie and Maximin was very well received by the population and, at least from November 1846, the bishop of Grenoble, Philibert de Bruillard, was convinced of the reality of the apparition, but, wishing to be able to support his judgment on indisputable evidence, he requested several reports from various commissions.

== The Ars incident ==
In September 1850, Maximin, who was advised by some to become a Marist, wanted to consult Father and future Saint John Vianney, known as the Curé of Ars, about his vocation. Brayer, benefactor of the two seers, and Verrier, one of the partisans of the "Baron de Richemont" who hoped that the secret of La Salette related to the destinies of this alleged Louis XVII, undertook to take Maximin to the famous priest. Maximin's guardian officially gave his consent, but the bishop of Grenoble opposed the trip. Maximin, stamping with vexation, refused to submit to this prohibition. Brayer and Verrier disregarded the will of the bishop and took Maximin to Ars accompanied by his sister Angélique, who was an adult.

The group arrived in Ars on 24 September in the evening. They were received by the Abbé Raymond, vicar of Ars, who expressed to Maximin a total incredulity with regard to the apparition of La Salette. The next morning, Maximin had a one-on-one interview with the Curé of Ars. After this interview, the priest, who until then had great confidence in the apparition of La Salette, declared to several people, in particular to ecclesiastics, that Maximin retracted his testimony. One of these ecclesiastics informed the episcopal commission in charge of investigating the apparition and Abbé Gerin, a member of the commission, came at the end of October to hear the Curé of Ars.

Maximin was questioned about the Ars incident at the minor seminary of Grenoble and at the bishopric. On 2 November, he attested in writing, at the minor seminary, that the Curé of Ars had not questioned him either about the apparition of La Salette or about his secret and that, for his part, in his answers to the parish priest and the vicar of Ars, he said nothing that was contrary to what he had said to thousands of others since the apparition. The same day, he declared before a special commission meeting at the bishopric that he had not retracted his testimony in Ars, but that, not hearing the priest distinctly, he sometimes said 'yes' and 'no' at random. "This is at least how Rousselot presents his explanations", adds Father Stern. (Canon Rousselot considered himself the postulator of the cause of La Salette.) On 8 November, Father Mélin, parish priest of Corps, and Canon Rousselot went to Ars. The Curé of Ars told them that Maximin confessed to him "that he had seen nothing and had lied when making his known story and had persisted in this lie for three years as he saw the good effects of it". On 21 November, Maximin wrote ("one made him write", says Father Stern) a letter to the Curé of Ars in which he gave the following explanation: "Allow me to tell you in all sincerity, that there has been a complete misunderstanding on your part. I did not want to tell you, Father, and I never said seriously to anyone, that I had seen nothing and had lied by making my known story and had persisted in this lie for three years, as I saw the good effects of it. I only told you, Father, when I left the sacristy and on the door, that I saw something and that I didn't know if it was the Blessed Virgin or another lady. At this moment you were advancing through the crowd and our conversation ceased." According to Father Stern, the least that can be said of Maximin's various explanations is that they lack coherence. (Later, in 1865, Maximin would give yet another explanation: the lie he had confessed to the Curé of Ars did not concern the apparition, but a theft of cherries he had committed in road to Ars. "As if", remarks Father Stern, "cherries grew in September!")

Bishop de Bruillard, however, tended to believe in the sincerity of Maximin's explanation by the misunderstanding. He supported this explanation in a letter he wrote to the Curé of Ars, as he forwarded to him that of Maximin: "During the recent visit to you by Canon Rousselot and M. Mélin, Pastor-Archpriest of Corps, you told these Gentlemen that Maximin had confessed to you 'that he had seen nothing and had lied in making his known story and had persisted in this lie for three years as he saw the good effects of it'. [...] Finally, you said to MM. Rousselot and Mélin that as a result of this interview with Maximin, you could no longer believe in the apparition of La Salette as before, and that you no longer believed in it. MM. Mélin and Rousselot told me all these things with a common voice. Now, such a change of opinion on your part, M. le Curé, which is more and more known, (for the very sake of the salvation of souls,) would be a very serious fact if the apparition is real, as believed nine bishops whom I consulted. If you misheard Maximin, as he affirms with all appearances of sincerity, in the judgment of several people who have my confidence, affirmation written in the attached document that the child addresses you very resolutely, you cannot exempt you from examining again, and you will not refuse to inform me of the result of this examination and of the opinion to which it may lead you. You understand, M. le Curé, that having encouraged the belief of the people in the apparition of La Salette, by the approval I gave to the publication of the reports drawn up by my order on this affair, you cannot put yourself in a kind of public opposition with me, without having the kindness to inform me of your reasons, since I have the honor to request them from you insistently."

In his answer, the Curé of Ars did not adopt the explanation based on the misunderstanding that the Bishop of Grenoble suggested to him. On the question of fact, he stood by his statements to the parish priest of Corps and to Canon Rousselot, but he did not exclude that the apparition could be authentic despite Maximin's categorical retraction: "It is not necessary to repeat to Your Highness what I said to these Gentlemen. The boy having told me that he had not seen the Blessed Virgin, I was tired of it for a couple of days. After all, Monseigneur, the wound is not so great, and if this fact is the work of God, man will not destroy it." This response of the Curé of Ars did not trouble Bishop de Bruillard. For him, it was not possible that the children invented all the circumstances of the apparition, so either there was a misunderstanding between the Curé of Ars and Maximin, or it was not seriously that Maximin said he had seen nothing.

The Curé of Ars continued to maintain that Maximin had in fact retracted his testimony. Abbé Alfred Monnin, who entered the entourage of the Curé of Ars as a missionary, reported as follows an interview he had with him in the presence of a few people:

– Father ("Monsieur le Curé"), what should we think of La Salette?

– My friend, you can think of it what you want: it is not an article of faith. For me, I think we have to love the Blessed Virgin.

– Would it be indiscreet to ask you to kindly tell us what happened between you and Maximin, in this interview about which so much noise is made? What impression did it leave to you?

– If Maximin did not deceive me, he did not see the Blessed Virgin.

– But, Father, it is said that Abbé Raymond had pushed this child to the limit and that it was to be delivered of this harassment that the boy said he had seen nothing.

– I don't know what Mr. Raymond did; but I know very well that I did not torment the boy. All I did was say to him, when he was brought to me: "So it was you, my friend, who saw the Blessed Virgin?"

– Maximin did not say that he had seen the Blessed Virgin; he only said that he had seen a great lady... There may be a misunderstanding there.

– No my friend, the boy told me that it was not true; that he hadn't seen anything.

– How come you didn't demand a public retraction from him?

– I told him: "My child, if you have lied, you must retract".

– It's not necessary, he replied, it's good for the people. There are many who convert. Then he added: "I would like to make a general confession and enter a religious house. When I am at the convent, I will say that I have said everything, and that I have nothing more to say." So I went on: 'My friend, it can't go like that; I must consult my Bishop".

– "Well! Father, consult. But it's not worth it. Thereupon, Maximin made his confession. [...]

– Father, are you sure you heard well what Maximin said to you?

– Oh! very sure! There are indeed some who wanted to say that I was deaf!... What didn't they say?... It seems to me that this is not how one defends the truth.

— Abbé Alfred Monnin, Vie du Curé d'Ars, t. 2, Paris, 1861, pp. 281–283, searchable on Google Books.

This passage from the book of Abbé Alfred Monnin disappeared from some later editions, but there are other testimonies in the same sense.

Father Stern notes that the Curé of Ars had very good hearing and was neither stupid nor stubborn: "If there had been the possibility of a misunderstanding on his part, why would he have had difficulty to admit it, he who asked nothing better than to believe?" Therefore, Father Stern adopts, with other authors favorable to the authenticity of the apparition, an explanation different from those that Maximin himself gave in 1850: Maximin would have voluntarily fooled the Curé of Ars. According to one of the partisans of this thesis of a hoax from Maximin, the vicar of Ars had affirmed before Maximin that the priest read consciences and Maximin would have liked to put the priest to the test. Father Stern, for his part, does not consider it necessary to make the vicar of Ars play an important role: Maximin was surrounded by naive people to whom he liked to tell balderdash and when these naive people spoke to him about the extraordinary priest of Ars, he behaved towards him as towards the others.

The Curé of Ars, whom the affair had plunged into desolation, confided to his auxiliary Catherine Lassagne, years after the recognition of the apparition by the bishop of Grenoble, that he was very annoyed not to believe in it. He ended up recovering his faith in La Salette for many reasons, one of which was purely subjective (deliverance from an inner pain) and the other of which (attribution of a miraculous cause to a help arriving during financial difficulties) was of a degree of objectivity that varied according to the witnesses.

== The 1851 episcopal letter and the persistence of the opposition ==
In an episcopal letter which is dated 19 September 1851 (fifth anniversary of the apparition), but which, at the bishopric, is classified among the November texts, Bishop de Bruillard declared the apparition authentic and authorized the cult of Our Lady of La Salette. This act weakened the opposition without making it disappear and its leaders, taking advantage in 1852 of the arrival of a new bishop (Mgr Ginoulhiac, replacing Mgr de Bruillard who had resigned), violently attacked the reality of the miracle of La Salette. Two ecclesiastics, Abbé Deléon and Cartellier, parish priest of the Saint-Joseph church in Grenoble, even claimed that the "beautiful lady" was in fact an old daughter called Mademoiselle de La Merlière, a former nun. This claim gave rise to a curious lawsuit for defamation which the plaintiff (La Merlière) lost twice, at first instance on 2 May 1855 and on appeal on 6 May 1857, despite an eloquent plea by Jules Favre.

Abbé Cartellier and Abbé Deléon continued thereafter to publish pamphlets against the apparition. The cardinal-archbishop of Lyon, Louis Jacques Maurice de Bonald, was favorable to the two polemicists. The Papacy did not commit.

== The basilica and the missionaries ==
The first stone of a large church was solemnly laid on the mountain of La Salette, on 25 May 1852, in front of a large congregation of believers. This church, later promoted to the rank of basilica, was served by religious called missionaries of La Salette.

== Similarities with the Letter of Jesus Christ on Sunday ==
On 2 May 1847, the Censeur, an anticlerical newspaper from Lyon, attacked the apparition of La Salette and denounced those who "deceive the credulity of peasants by inventing miracles, such as the letters of Jesus Christ, the apparitions of angels and the Virgin".

These 'letters of Jesus Christ' are variants of the Carta dominica, a New Testament apocryphon whose first known mention dates from around 584.

In such a "letter", seized in 1818 from a peddler in the department of Isère, Christ says in particular: "Attacks (sins) so worthy of the most cruel punishments, are stopped by the prayers of the divine Mary my very dear Mother [...]. I have given you six days to work, and the seventh to rest [...] but you make it a day to accomplish the works of the devil, such as gambling, drunkenness, blasphemy [...]." A similar document, seized from the same peddler, begins with these words: "Here is the hand of Our Lord Jesus Christ, which is ready to punish sinners" and then makes the Virgin say: "I can no longer stop the anger of my Son".

The Censeur of Lyon, as seen above, had mentioned the apparition of La Salette and the Letters of Jesus Christ in the same article, but had not compared the message of the apparition and the content of the Letters. This comparison was made in 1855 by a Belgian anticlerical author who signed "François-Joseph". He reproduces (after Voltaire) a version of the Letter of Jesus Christ allegedly fallen from heaven at Paimpol in 1771, which contains in particular the following words: "I warn you that, if you continue to live in sin [...], I will make you feel the weight of my divine arm. If it weren't for my dear mother's prayers, I would have already destroyed the earth, for the sins you commit against one another. I have given you six days to work, and the seventh to rest, to sanctify my holy name, to hear holy mass, and to use the rest of the day in the service of God my father. On the contrary, we only see blasphemy and drunkenness". The Letter of Jesus Christ being considered as apocryphal by the Church, François-Joseph concludes, from the similarities between this Letter and the speech of Our Lady of La Salette, that there are there two related impostures.

Hippolyte Delehaye SJ, president of the Bollandist Society, expressed in 1928 an opinion similar to that of François-Joseph: "We will add that the famous question of the 'fact of La Salette' had could have been settled sooner and more easily if one had recognized in the words attributed to the Blessed Virgin one of the forms of the celestial letter, barely demarcated. [...] One has not even taken the trouble to arrange a text originally placed in the mouth of the Saviour, but which, pronounced by the Virgin, no longer makes sense: 'I gave you six days to work, I reserved the seventh for myself, and they don't want to give it me.' Particularly significant is the title given to the first draft, written on September 20, 1846, the very day after the event: 'Letter dictated by the Blessed Virgin to two children on the mountain of La Salette-Fallavaux.' We won't add any comments."

== The secrets ==
No mention of secrets is made in the children's first accounts. The children later reported that the Blessed Virgin had confided a special secret to each of them. These two secrets, which neither Mélanie nor Maximin ever made known to each other, were sent by them in 1851 to Pope Pius IX on the advice of de Bruillard. It is assumed that these secrets were of a personal nature. Maximin advised the Marquise de Monteyard, "Ah, it is good fortune." In October 1999, Fr. Michel Corteville discovered the original texts of the Secrets given to Pope Pius IX in 1851, buried for over a century in the Vatican Apostolic Archive.

=== Subsequent version of Mélanie's secret ===
In 1879, Mélanie released a greatly expanded version of the secret, including new interpretations of the true secret as well as completely new revelations unmentioned in the 1851 version; such new version were published under the title of L'apparition de la très Sainte Vierge de la Salette and contained several apocalyptic claims, such as that Rome would lose its faith and become the See of the Antichrist. While the book initially received an imprimatur by Archbishop Salvatore Luigi Zola of Lecce, its contents were later deemed to be false and in contrast with the Catholic faith by the Holy See, and were subsequently put onto the Index Librorum Prohibitorum by decree of the Holy Office on 9 May 1923.

The Catholic Encyclopedia describes the new version of the secret as "a work of imagination", arguing that, over the years, Mélanie's mind had been disturbed by reading apocalyptic books and the lives of the Illuminati.

== Fate of the children ==
Maximin Giraud died on 1 March 1875, in Corps, the village which he was born.

Mélanie Calvat died at Altamura, Italy, on 15 December 1904.

== Legacy ==
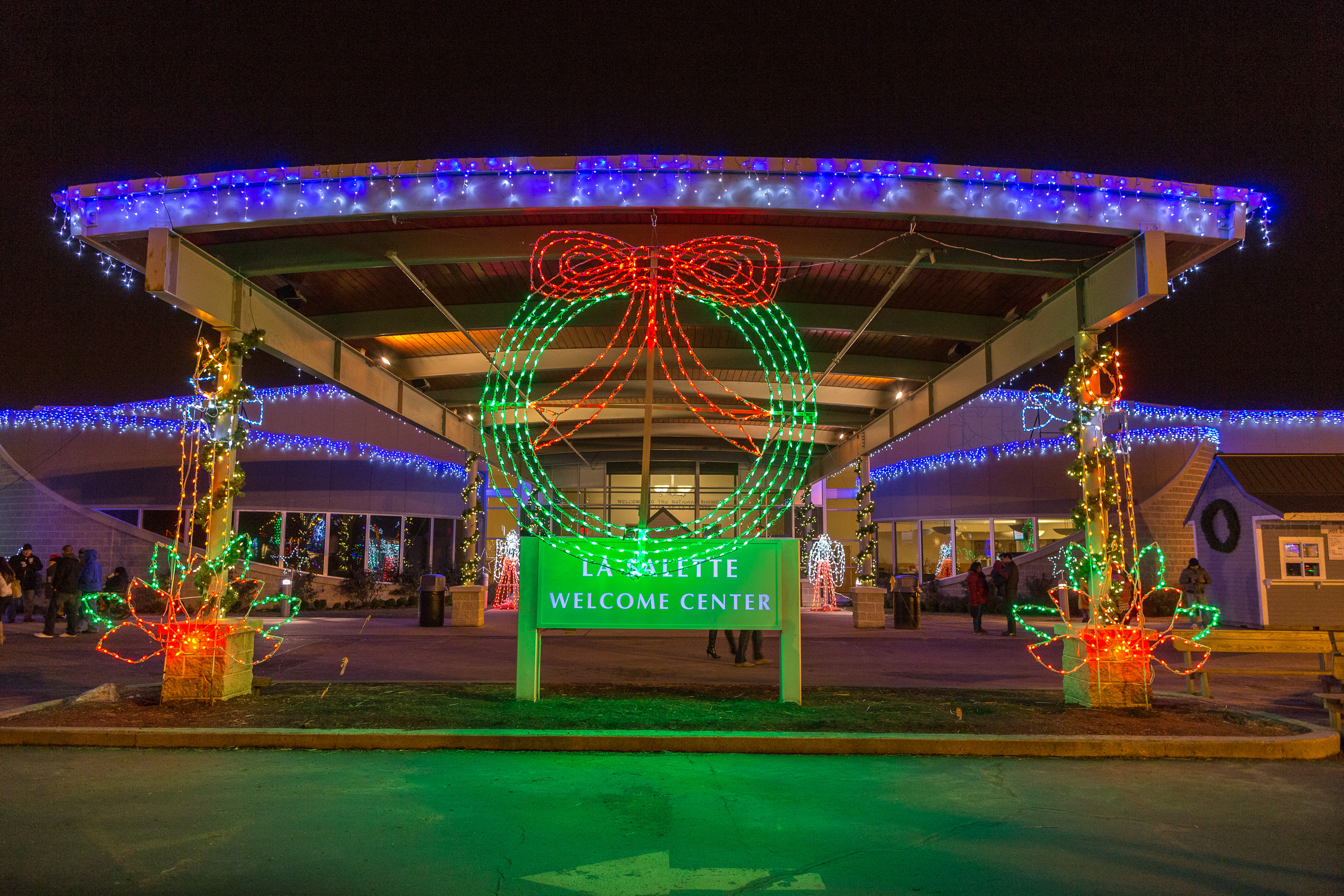
La Salette Shrine, Attleboro, Massachusetts

The Missionaries of Our Lady of La Salette were founded in 1852 by Philbert de Bruillard, Bishop of Grenoble, France, and presently serve in some 25 countries.

The U.S. National Shrine of Our Lady of La Salette is located in Attleboro, Massachusetts. Known simply as "La Salette" locally, it is famous for its Festival of Lights, held annually during the Christmas season, where the grounds are decorated with elaborate Christmas light displays. The shrine is visited by over 1 million people per year and hosts many pilgrimages and retreats throughout the year.

== See also ==
- Our Lady of Fátima
- Our Lady of Lourdes
- Visions of Jesus and Mary
- Léon Bloy § Our Lady of La Salette

== Bibliography ==
- Jean Stern, La Salette - Documents authentiques, t. 1, Septembre 1846–début mars 1847, Éd. Desclée De Brouwer, 1980.
- Jean Stern, La Salette - Documents authentiques, t. 2, Fin mars 1847–avril 1849, Paris, Éditions du Cerf; Corps, Association des Pèlerins de La Salette; 1984.
- Jean Stern, La Salette - Documents authentiques, t. 3, 1er mai 1849–4 novembre 1854, Paris, Éditions du Cerf; Corps, Association des Pèlerins de La Salette; 1991.
