= La Salette-Fallavaux =

- Commune
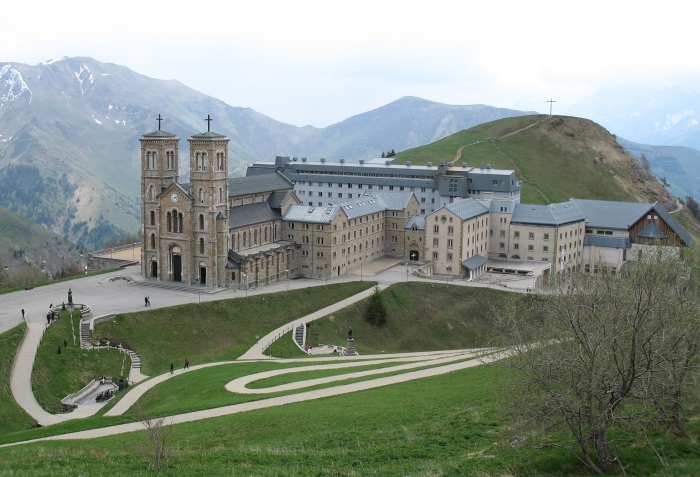
- The sanctuary of Our Lady of La Salette
- Location of La Salette-Fallavaux
- Location within France Location within Auvergne-Rhône-Alpes
- Coordinates: 44°50′28″N 5°58′33″E
- Country: France
- Region: Auvergne-Rhône-Alpes
- Department: Isère
- Arrondissement: Grenoble
- Canton: Matheysine-Trièves

Government
  - Mayor (2020–2026): Gilda Perrin
- Area^{1}: 22 km^{2} (8.5 sq mi)
- Elevation: 1,140 m (3,740 ft)
- Highest elevation: 2,402 m (7,881 ft)
- Lowest elevation: 983 m (3,225 ft)
- Population (2023): 81
  - Density: 3.7/km^{2} (9.5/sq mi)
- Time zone: UTC+01:00 (CET)
  - Summer (DST): UTC+02:00 (CEST)
- INSEE/Postal code: 38469 /38970
- ^{1} French Land Register data, which excludes lakes, ponds, glaciers > 1 km^{2} (0.386 sq mi or 247 acres) and river estuaries.

La Salette-Fallavaux (French pronunciation: [la salˈɛt falavˈo]) is a commune in the Isère department in southeastern France. The sanctuary of Our Lady of La Salette in the mountains above the village is a well-known pilgrimage site devoted to an 1846 Marian apparition.

== Population ==
Historical population
Year	Pop.	±% p.a.
1968	107	—
1975	79	−4.24%
1982	88	+1.55%
1990	86	−0.29%
1999	76	−1.36%
2007	68	−1.38%
2012	75	+1.98%
2017	65	−2.82%
2023	81	+3.74%
Source: INSEE

== See also ==
- Communes of the Isère department
