= Catholic congregations in France =

Catholicism in France

Catholic congregations in France are institutions, approved by bishops or popes, which have been created over time in response to the needs or crises of the Church, and are an illustration of the Church's evolution. Novices, aspiring to religious life, become monks by making a lifelong commitment to the three Vows of obedience, chastity and poverty.

Monks, nuns and religious people live in a community whose life is organized by a rule. This is why they are considered, in a broad and somewhat inaccurate sense, to form the regular clergy. However, nuns are not canonically part of the clergy, and strictly speaking, monks who have not received holy orders are lay people.

== The beginnings: 5th–9th centuries ==
From the earliest days of Christianity, asceticism was a form of self-giving, and monastic communities were established as early as the 2nd century. Pachomius the Great is considered the father of cenobitism or community life, generally contrasted with eremitism or anachoresis. Pachomius believed that solitude was dangerous, as it could lead to despair.

As early as 360, Martin of Tours founded the Abbey of St. Martin of Ligugé near Poitiers. At the beginning of the 5th century, John Cassian founded Abbey of Saint-Victor and Abbey of Lérins. In Gaul in the 5th century, the monk Columbanus de Bangor, a missionary from Ireland, reformed numerous monasteries at the request of the Merovingian king Guntram and founded, among others, the monastery of Luxeuil. On this occasion, he wrote the severe Rule of Saint Columbanus, which emphasizes penance and mortification. This rule was adopted by the vast majority of monasteries in Gaul.

=== The rise of Benedictine monasticism ===
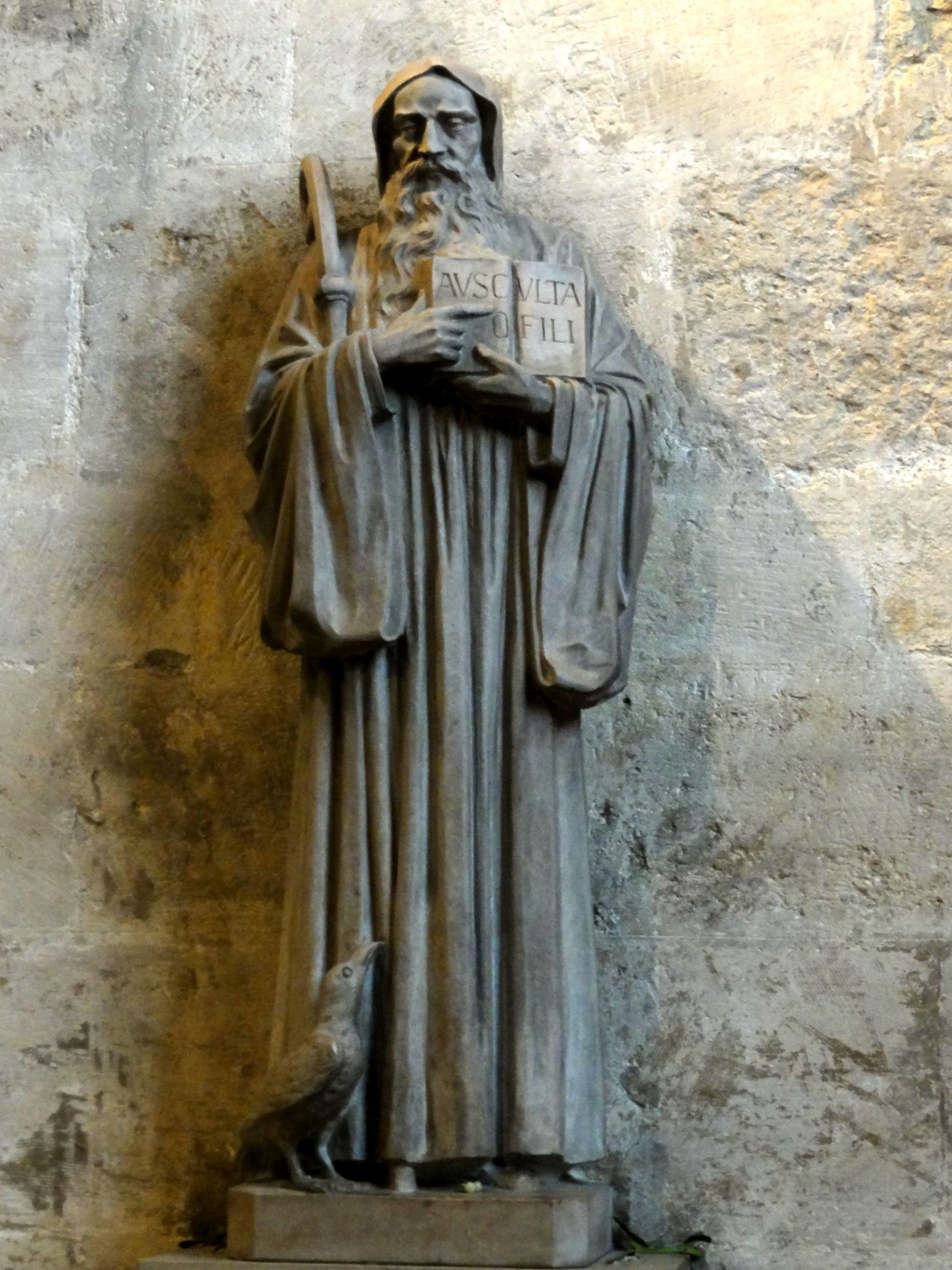
Statue of Saint Benedict of Nursia, Saint-Germain-des-Prés abbey.

When Benedict of Nursia founded a monastery on Monte Cassino around 529, the Rule of Life he drew up around 540 became widely known throughout Europe. St. Benedict's motto was Pax, "peace". It has remained the motto of the Benedictine order. Under the impetus of Charlemagne, who asked the Abbot of Mont Cassino for a copy of St. Benedict's rule, and his son Louis the Pious, the Carolingian emperors turned to St. Benedict of Aniane, who wrote the Concordia regularum, commenting on the rule of St. Benedict of Nursia and referring to those of Basil, Paschomius and Columban. In 817, Louis the Pious imposed the Rule of St. Benedict on all monasteries in the empire with the capitulaire monasticum, prepared by Benedict of Aniane.

Ora et labora (pray and work), are the two activities of the monk. In the scriptorium, they recopy ancient manuscripts, both religious and secular. Monks were at the heart of the Carolingian renaissance. Alcuin, abbot of Saint-Martin de Tours, was Charlemagne's most sought-after advisor. Hincmar, monk of Saint-Denis and later archbishop of Reims, was the great theologian, and a staunch defender of orthodoxy against Scot Erigene. He had Pope Nicholas I condemn his opinions on Eucharistic symbolism, which led to the denial of the Real Presence.

=== The Ordo monachorum ===
In Carolingian society, monks constituted a social group (ordo) with a function (officium, ministerium). Monasteries were centers of culture and education: schools were opened there. Some parents placed their children as oblates at an early age; the most famous example is Hincmar, who entered Saint-Denis as a child. The abbeys owned considerable property, and most of the monks worked in the fields, which enabled them to provide for the needs of the poor and passing pilgrims. The Redon Cartulary and Irminon's polyptych for Saint-Germain-des-Prés list their possessions. The domain of the latter covered 33,000 ha. These possessions came from donations made to the abbeys, as the monks' essential function was to be intercessors, through their prayers, who opened the gates of Heaven.

The nuns were forced to respect the enclosure, and the abbesses could only travel with the permission of the bishop. The bishop of Metz, Chrodegang, gave his canons a rule that was a compromise between communal life and pastoral missions.

The Norman, Hungarian, and Saracen invasions of the 9th and 10th centuries largely ruined these efforts. At the beginning of the 9th century, the founding of the Abbey of Cluny is, for historians, the harbinger of the so-called Gregorian reform. Faced with the disintegration of royal power and Carolingian institutions in West Francia, Cluny sought to escape the dubious authority of simoniac bishops. It benefited from the pontifical privilege of exemption, which freed it from the power of the local bishop and placed it directly under the authority of Rome. In 991, at the Council of Saint-Basle de Verzy, convened to judge the Archbishop of Rheims, she and Abbon of Fleury supported the Pope's exclusive jurisdiction over Gerbert d'Aurillac, who favored the jurisdiction of the Council of the Gauls in the case of a peer.

== Renewal at the start of the second millennium ==
In search of a mainly contemplative life, Bruno of Cologne withdrew with a few companions to the northern pre-Alps in 1084, where he founded the Carthusian Order.

In 1098, reacting against the opulence of certain monasteries, a group of Benedictines founded the Abbey of Cîteaux. Bernard of Clairvaux played a key role in the birth of the Cistercian Order, and in his desire to respect the spirit of the Rule of Saint Benedict, his reform reintroduced manual labor and strict poverty. This led to the birth of the Grandmontines, Premonstratensians, Gilbertins, Congregation of Savigny and many others.

This need for reform also led to the creation of Mendicant orders, notably the Franciscans around 1210 and the Dominicans around 1215, who chose a life of poverty and preaching; they set up their convents in the heart of towns to be close to the faithful. Personalities of this new type of conventual life even found their way into universities (Thomas Aquinas, Bonaventure). Thanks to these Mendicant orders, many Christians remained faithful to the Church.

== Reforms from the 16th century onwards ==
=== Before the Council of Trent ===
In 1517, the Order of Friars Minor Capuchin emerged from the Franciscan order, further emphasizing the latter's ideal of poverty.

At the same time, in Rome in 1524, Saint Cajetan de Thiene and Mgr Pietro Carafa, later Pope Paul IV, founded an order of regular clerics: the Theatines.

Little by little, congregations sprang up, specializing in specific activities.

- In 1530 in Milan, Anthony Zaccaria founded the Order of Clerics Regular of St. Paul, otherwise known as the Barnabites, for instruction.
- The Somaschi Fathers, founded in 1532 in Somasca, northern Italy by St. Gerolamo Emiliani, dedicated to caring for the sick and educating orphans.
- St. John of God, in 1537 in Granada, laid the foundations of the Hospitaller Order of the Brothers of St. John of God, for the care of the poor and sick.
- In 1540 Ignatius of Loyola created the Society of Jesuits, a new order of regular clerics, whose main activities were missionary work and teaching.
- Women's congregations were also founded, including the Ursulines, the first female teaching order, in 1535 under the impetus of Saint Angela Merici.

=== Foundations and reforms following the Council of Trent ===
==== Reformed congregations ====
Saint Teresa of Avila reformed the female Carmelite order in 1562, followed by Saint John of the Cross, who in 1568 reformed the male branch of Carmel, developing the order of Discalced Carmelites.

The Benedictine order was reformed by the Congregation of Saint-Vanne et Saint-Hydulphe in 1604, then by the Congregation of Saint-Maur in 1621.

Abbé Armand de Rancé joined the Cistercians in 1664 at the La Trappe Abbey.

==== Foundations ====
In 1575, in Rome, Saint Philip Neri created the Confederation of Oratories of Saint Philip Neri, an apostolic society of priests dedicated to education and preaching.

The Camillians, founded in 1584, dedicated to caring for the sick.

The Piarist Order, founded in Rome in 1597 by St. Joseph Calasanz to teach poor children.

Female teaching congregations experienced unprecedented vitality in the 17th century. In Lorraine, Pierre Fourier and Alix Le Clerc founded the congregation of the Sœurs de Notre-Dame, and in Bordeaux, Jeanne de Lestonnac founded the Compagnie de Marie Notre-Dame. In Lyon, Charles Démia establishes the Sœurs de Saint-Charles. Nicolas Barré founded the Maîtresses des Ecoles gratuites et charitables du St-Enfant Jésus in Rouen. The Sœurs de l'Enfant-Jésus (founded by Canon Roland in Reims), the Sœurs de Saint-Joseph and the Sœurs de l'Instruction chrétienne (in Le Puy), the Sœurs d'Évron (in Mayenne), the Sœurs de la Charité et de l'Instruction chrétienne (in Nevers), the Présentation de Tours, the Sœurs d'Ernemont (in Rouen), the Sœurs de Saint-Paul de Chartres, des Écoles charitables (in Nantes) and de Saint-Paul (in Tréguier) were also founded.

In 1610, in Annecy, France, Saint François de Sales and Saint Jane Frances de Chantal founded the Order of the Visitation of Holy Mary, a women's order combining contemplative life and education.

In 1611, Cardinal Pierre de Bérulle founded the Congregation of the Oratory of Jesus and Mary Immaculate in Paris, with the same aim as the oratorians of Saint Philip Neri.

The Congregation of the Mission (Lazaristes) was founded in Paris in 1625 by Saint Vincent de Paul. Together with Saint Louise de Marillac, he was also behind the founding of the Daughters of Charity in Paris in 1633, dedicated to serving the sick and poor.

In 1641, Jean-Jacques Olier founded the Society of the Priests of Saint Sulpice in Paris, in response to the need for priestly training and the creation of seminaries prescribed by the Council.

In the same spirit, Saint John Eudes, a few years later, in 1643 in Caen, founded the Congregation of Jesus and Mary, otherwise known as the Eudists.

Saint John Baptist de La Salle, from 1680 in Reims, wanted to provide education for the poor, and laid the foundations for what was to become the Institute of the Brothers of the Christian Schools.

==== The expulsion of the Jesuits ====
The Jesuits were attacked by Jansenists, Gallicists and parliamentarians, and later by philosophical atheists. They were banned from France in 1763-4, and their two hundred colleges closed.

== The suppression of congregations during the French Revolution ==
The Constituent assembly, by decree of 2 November 1789, placed the property of the Church, including that of the congregations, at the disposal of the Nation. The decree of 13 February 1790 prohibited monastic vows and abolished regular religious orders. The decree concerned 100,000 clergy not attached to a parish, i.e. two-thirds of the clergy considered not "useful". The criteria for "usefulness" were the sacraments and the care of souls, teaching, caring for the sick and infirm, and helping the destitute.

With the decree of 18 August 1792, the Legislative Assembly abolished secular congregations, mainly for teaching and hospital work.

== From the Consulate to the Second Empire ==
The Consulate, in the organic articles appended to the 1801 Concordat, confirmed the abolition of all ecclesiastical establishments (except cathedral chapters and seminaries).

The decree of 3 Messidor An XII opened up the possibility of congregation formation, subject to formal authorization by imperial decree.

Article 109 of the imperial decree of 17 March 1808 organizing the University recognized the Institute of the Brothers of the Christian Schools.

The decree of 18 February 1809 allowed the reconstitution of women's hospital congregations simply by approving their statutes, as their prohibition had caused too many difficulties in caring for the sick.

After the Napoleonic Wars, the political climate had changed. The monarchs who had expelled the Jesuits were no longer in power, and Pope Pius VII proceeded with the universal restoration of the Society by promulgating the decree Sollicitudo omnium ecclesiarum on 7 August 1814.

The law of 2 January 1817 required congregations to be recognized by statute to acquire real estate and annuities, and to receive gifts and legacies.

In the decades that followed, legislation became increasingly favorable to women's congregations. The law of 24 May 1825 authorized the opening of new congregations, while those existing before 1 January 1825 were to be opened by simple royal decree. The creation of establishments by authorized congregations would only be subject to a royal authorization order.

The decree of 31 January 1852 called for women's religious congregations "dedicated to the education of youth and the relief of the poor" to be given the means to obtain legal recognition.

== The Third Republic ==
Under the French Third Republic, the anticlerical movement, while remaining fairly tolerant of the secular clergy, pursued a policy of eliminating congregations.

=== 1880: The first expulsion ===
On 29 March 1880, two decrees were signed by Charles de Freycinet, President of the Council, and Jules Ferry, Minister of Public Instruction, to expel the Jesuits from France once again, and to require other congregations to request authorization within three months, on pain of dissolution and dispersal. As most decided not to apply for authorization out of solidarity with the Jesuits, at the end of the short deadline, unauthorized congregations (Benedictines, Order of Friars Minor Capuchin, Carmelites, Franciscans, Assumptionists, etc.) were expelled. Some Dominican convents were closed. The monks of the Grande Chartreuse and the Trappists remained untroubled.

In all, 5,643 Jesuits were expelled and 261 convents closed.

=== 1903: The second expulsion ===
The law of 1 July 1901 on associations subjected congregations to an exceptional regime described in Title III of the law:

"No religious congregation may be formed without authorization given by a law which will determine the conditions of its operation. No new establishment may be founded except by virtue of a decree issued by the Council of State. The dissolution of the congregation or the closure of any establishment may be pronounced by a decree issued by the Council of Ministers". (art.13)

Members of an unauthorized congregation are prohibited from teaching or running an educational establishment. (art.14)

The list of members and the congregation's accounts and inventory are available to the prefect. (art.15)

Any congregation formed without authorization will be declared illegal. (art.16)

Existing congregations (...) that have not previously been authorized or recognized must, within three months, prove that they have taken the necessary steps to comply with these requirements. In the absence of such justification, they will be deemed dissolved ipso jure; the same will apply to congregations whose authorization has been refused. (art.18)"

The Vatican condemned the law, but left congregations free to request authorization, which most of them did. However, the Bloc des gauches' victory in the legislative elections of May 1902 brought Émile Combes to power, allied with Jaurès' Socialists, whose government waged a fierce anti-clerical battle. In the spring of 1903, Combes sent the Chamber fifty-four applications for authorization for male congregations, submitted by more than nineteen hundred and fifteen houses. The applications were divided into three groups: twenty-five "teaching" congregations (representing 1,689 houses and 11,841 religious), twenty-eight "preaching" congregations (225 houses and 3,040 religious) and one commercial congregation (the Carthusian monks, 48 monks). At the same time, Combes forwarded to the Senate the requests of six "hospitable, missionary and contemplative" congregations of men, five with favorable opinions, which would remain tolerated: the Brothers Hospitallers of Saint John of God, the trappists, the Lérins Abbey, the White Fathers, and the Society of African Missions, one with a negative opinion: the Salesians of Don Bosco.

As for women's congregations, 390 applied for authorization. Only 81 applications from "teaching" congregations were forwarded to the Chamber with unfavorable opinions.

The Chamber or the Senate followed Combes' recommendations. Unauthorized congregations were expelled in April 1903. The monks of the Grande Chartreuse were expelled manu militari on 29 April 1903.

In the summer of 1902, Émile Combes ordered the closure of 3,000 unauthorized schools run by authorized congregations in France, and the movement gathered pace in 1903 with the passing of the law of 4 December 1902, which stipulated that anyone who opened an unauthorized congregational school was liable to a fine or imprisonment:

- Anyone who opens a Congregational school without authorization, – Anyone who, after a closure order, continues the activities of the establishment or promotes its organization or operation.

=== 1904: The suppression of teaching congregations ===
The final blow was dealt to teaching congregations by the law of 7 July 1904, article 1 of which states:

"Teaching of any order and of any kind is forbidden in France to congregations."

"Congregations authorized as exclusively teaching congregations will be abolished within a maximum period of ten years.

"The same will apply to congregations and establishments which, although authorized for several purposes, were in fact exclusively devoted to teaching on January 1, 1903.

"Congregations that have been authorized, and those applying for authorization, both for teaching and for other purposes, retain the benefit of this authorization or instance of authorization only for the non-teaching services provided for in their statutes".

Nearly 2,000 schools were closed, and tens of thousands of religious who had made education their preferred field of action found themselves banned from exercising their profession, and faced with the choice of retraining, abandoning the regular state, or going into exile. Some secularized, at the call of bishops, to ensure the survival of their work, but many chose fidelity to their vocation and therefore exile, preferably as close to France as possible, in the hope of a possible return.

Between 30 and 60,000 French religious thus left to found establishments abroad: Belgium, Spain, Switzerland, but also the "missionary" route. Some 1,300 arrived in Canada between 1901 and 1904, leaving their mark on Quebec society.

=== 1914: The Sacred Union ===
Many religious remained abroad, contributing to the internationalization of the congregations, but the Sacred Union proclaimed when the First World War broke out, and underlined by the circular of 2 August 1914 from Interior Minister Louis Malvy inviting prefects:

"to suspend the execution of decrees closing or refusing authorization issued in application of the law of 1901, of closure orders issued in execution of the law of 1904 and of all measures generally taken in execution of said laws, 9,323 religious returned from exile to be mobilized; 1,237 of them were wounded and 1,571 lost their lives in the fighting."

At the end of the war, many congregations returned to France, confident of the openness created by the resumption of relations with the Holy See in 1921. However, on 2 June 1924, the new President of the Council, Édouard Herriot, announced the resumption of the expulsion of congregations, the abolition of the embassy to the Holy See and the application of the law of separation of Church and State to Alsace and Moselle.

In response to these threats, two months later the League for the Rights of Religious Veterans (DRAC) was founded by the Benedictine François-Josaphat Moreau, and in October the Jesuit Paul Doncœur published an open letter to Herriot entitled "For the honor of France, we will not leave". The government renounces its intentions, and no religious leave French territory.

=== 1939/1940: Appeasement ===
The decree-law of 16 January 1939 issued by Georges Mandel, Minister for the Colonies, allowed each religious denomination to set up a mission in the overseas territories, with a board of directors and "civil personality", enabling the Catholic mission in the Marquesas Islands to retain ownership of all its land. Mandel's decree-law of 6 December 1939 modified certain articles of the previous decree.

In 1940, the 43 Carthusian fathers expelled in 1903 were still waiting in Italy for permission to return to France, where right-wing politicians were campaigning for "the Carthusian monastery to be returned to the Carthusians". The Vatican asked France to return to freedom for religious congregations. Finally, the Second World War enabled the Carthusian monks to regain a temporary foothold in France: on 10 May 1940, Germany invaded France, and the monks were threatened with expulsion from Italy if Mussolini also attacked France. On 29 May 1940, hoping that Pope Pius XII would put pressure on Mussolini to prevent Italy from going to war against France, Interior Minister Georges Mandel authorized the congregations to return to France. On 9 June 1940, Georges Mandel authorized the return of the Carthusian monks and their installation in France, although it remained illegal under the 1901 law.

== The Vichy regime ==
The armistice of 1940 left Catholics with an immense sense of guilt. Catholic writer Paul Claudel wrote in his diary on 5–7 July 1940:

"[...] France is delivered after sixty years under the yoke of the anti-Catholic radical party (professors, lawyers, Jews, Freemasons). The new government invokes God and returns the Grande Chartreuse to the monks. Hope for deliverance from universal suffrage and parliamentarianism [...] "

Some Catholics blamed the defeat on the reserve teachers who were the first to give up. In the 28 June 1940 issue of La Croix, Mgr Saliège, Bishop of Toulouse, wrote:

"[...] For having driven God out of the school, out of the nation's law courts, for having put up with unhealthy literature, the white slave trade, for the degrading promiscuity of workshops, offices and factories, Lord, we ask your forgiveness [...] What use have we made of the victory of 1918? What use would we have made of an easy victory in 1940? [...] "

As early as the summer of 1940, the episcopate reiterated to the new government the requests for aid to free education for which talks had been held with the Daladier government. In addition, the Church wanted congregations to be considered as associations, which would make them subject to a simple declaration. But members of the government, such as Marcel Peyrouton, Minister of the Interior, took up the classic argument against congregations: a congregation is not an association like any other, the bond between members of the congregation is strict, with the latter relinquishing all elements in favor of the group. The congregation reports to a foreign power, the Vatican: "Secret societies have just been banned. We must be careful not to undermine the authority of the State by creating an exception". The bishops' contact was Jacques Chevalier, head of the government's Department of Public instruction, who issued a series of laws and decrees in September 1940.

On 3 September, the Vichy regime passed the law of 3 September 1940, drafted under the authority of Raphaël Alibert, which repealed in its entirety the law of 7 July 1904, which prohibited religious from teaching in the public sector, including private schools. It also repealed article 14 of the law of 1 July 1901, which prohibited unauthorized congregations from teaching. From now on, teaching congregations may return to France. They have the right to set up new establishments (for example, the Brothers of the Christian Schools can resume their teaching activities in their own establishments).

However, the Vatican is opposed to a provision of the law which stipulates that recognition of a congregation is conditional on the congregation's superior being resident in France. Furthermore, article 16 of the law of 1 July 1901 required a request for authorization from the State, meaning that in practice a congregation had to be recognized by the Conseil d'État. This status was maintained in subsequent decades. The superior of the Solesmes Abbey, refusing to apply to the Conseil d'État, led a fronde of congregations.

The law of 15 October entitles children in private schools to assistance from the caisse des écoles. The political crisis that saw the departure of Pierre Laval at the end of 1940 also eliminated Marcel Peyrouton, but it was Darlan's éminence grise, Henri Moysset, who took over from Peyrouton to defend the interests of the State. The law of 6 January 1941 allowed communes to grant subsidies to private schools.

The law of 15 February 1941 extended the deadline for allocating real estate belonging to public religious establishments to religious associations. It was extended to the Antilles and Reunion by the law of 14 June 1941. The law of 21 February 1941 fully regularized the presence of the six Carthusian communities in France, by explicitly and definitively authorizing the return of the Carthusians.

On 8 July 1941, a law allowed religious associations to collect donations and bequests, subject to administrative authorization. This provision marked the end of the bishops' challenge to the 1905 law. The Vichy regime granted substantial subsidies to private schools. Private denominational schools received state subsidies (400 million francs in 1941).

The circular of 26 February 1942 sets out the ten articles on worship recognized by the Republic, including the requirement that all Catholic congregations be placed under the jurisdiction of a bishop.

Law no. 505 of 8 April 1942, relaxes the provisions of Title III of the 1 July 1901 law. The law abrogated article 16, which required authorization on pain of being "declared illicit", and put an end to the hunt for religious organizations. Article 13 was amended: the founding of a congregation was no longer subject to authorization by a law passed by Parliament, but by a decree issued after the assent of the Conseil d'État:

"Any religious congregation may obtain legal recognition by decree issued with the assent of the Conseil d'État; the provisions relating to previously authorized congregations apply to them.

Legal recognition may be granted to any new congregational establishment by virtue of a decree issued by the Conseil d'État.

The dissolution of the congregation or the suppression of any establishment may only be pronounced by decree with the assent of the Conseil d'État."

– Article 13 of the law of July 1, 1901 (version in force in 2010).

The law of 25 December 1942, modifies article 19 of the law of 1905, and allows public authorities to provide financial support for cult buildings belonging to religious associations. The budgets for 1942, 1943 and 1944 included subsidies for Catholic institutes and three Protestant faculties. Secondary education (collège and lycée), which had become free in 1933, became fee-paying again.

== From the Liberation to the present day ==
Finally, at the time of the Liberation, it turned out that the law of 3 September 1940 had not been used. Only three minor congregations obtained legal recognition, including the Carmel de Créteil.

After the Vichy regime had authorized the return of teaching congregations and permitted the subsidization of private schools, General de Gaulle's order of 9 August 1944 extended the Vichy measures. However, the deputies of the French Republic voted to abolish all aid and subsidies to denominational schools, without going back on the authorization of congregations: the laws of 3 September 1940 and 8 April 1942 were confirmed in 1945. It wasn't until 1 January 2005, that the Caisses des écoles were also able to help children in private schools. In 1959, the Debré law re-established subsidies to private schools in exchange for the signing of a contract, and compulsory schooling was officially raised to 16 (from 14 in 1936).

In 1970, the Pompidou presidency proposed that unrecognized congregations apply to the State for legal recognition. By 1987, 249 apostolic institutes out of 365 and 114 monasteries out of 323 were recognized on the female side, and 25 apostolic institutes out of 62 and 23 monasteries out of 43 on the male side. Jesuits have only been officially admitted to France since 24 February 2001.

The only alternative for congregations refusing "legal recognition" is "de facto association". This is the solution adopted by the Solesmes Congregation. In this case, the congregation has no legal personality. It cannot sign any contracts in the abbey's name, own its own buildings, receive donations or legacies, open a bank account, obtain a car registration document.

Originally intended for Catholic communities, the provisions of the texts on congregations have been applied to Protestant, Orthodox, ecumenical and Buddhist communities.

At the end of the 20th century, some traditional orders were going through a crisis, and secular institutes were also appearing.

== See also ==
- List of religious institutes

== Bibliography ==
- Hasquenoph, Sophie (2009). Histoire des ordres et congrégations religieuses en France, du Moyen ge à nos jours (in French). Éd. Champ Vallon.
- Duran, Jean-Paul (1999). La liberté des congrégations religieuses en France (in French). Cerf.
- Sorre, Christian (2003). La République contre les congrégations – Histoire d'une passion française (1899–1904) (in French). Cerf. ISBN 2-204-07128-5.
- Lapperière, Guy. Les Congrégations religieuses. De la France au Québec, 1880-1914 (in French). Les Presses de l’Université Laval.
- Durand, Jean-Dominique; Cabanel, Patrick (2005). Le Grand Exil des congrégations religieuses françaises 1901–1914 (in French). Cerf. ISBN 978-2-204-07469-8.
- Sévillia, Jean (2005). Quand les catholiques étaient hors la loi. Tempus (in French). éditions Perrin.
- Bourgeois, René (2000). L'expulsion des chartreux. 1903 (in French). Presses Universitaires de Grenoble.
- Lalouette, Jacqueline; Machelon, Jean-Pierre (2002). Les congrégations hors la loi ? Autour de la loi du 1er juillet 1901 (in French). Letouzey et Ané.
- Cointet, Michèle (1998). L'Église sous Vichy, 1940–1945 (in French). Perrin.
- Chélini, Jean (1991). Histoire religieuse de l'Occident médiéval (in French).
- Duquesne, Jacques (1986). Les catholiques français sous l'occupation (in French). Fayard.
- Gounon, Marie-Pascale (1997). La vie religieuse féminine en Haute-Loire à la fin du xviiie siècle et pendant la Révolution (1789–1816) (in French). Cahiers de la Haute-Loire.
- Gounon, Marie-Pascale (1999). La vie religieuse féminine en Haute-Loire à la fin du xviiie siècle… (deuxième partie) (in French). Cahiers de la Haute-Loire.
- Gounon, Marie-Pascale (1999). La vie religieuse féminine en Haute-Loire à la fin du xviiie siècle (troisième partie) (in French). Cahiers de la Haute-Loire.
