= Caterina Cittadini =

Italian religious sister

Blessed Caterina Cittadini

Religious
- Born: 28 September 1801; Bergamo, Cisalpine Republic
- Died: 5 May 1857 (aged 55); Somasca, Bergamo, Kingdom of Lombardy–Venetia
- Venerated in: Roman Catholic Church
- Beatified: 29 April 2001, Saint Peter's Square, Vatican City by Pope John Paul II
- Feast: 5 May
- Patronage: Ursuline Sisters of St. Jerome Emiliani; Orphans; Educators

Caterina Cittadini (28 September 1801 – 5 May 1857) was an Italian Roman Catholic religious from Bergamo who established the Ursuline Sisters of Saint Jerome Emiliani. The order was dedicated to the education of girls in Bergamo and in the surrounding areas and has since expanded outside of the Italian nation. Cittadini was orphaned as a child and cultivated her faith among fellow children in an orphanage where the spiritual direction was strong. Her order came in part of her devotion to Saint Jerome Emiliani as well as the Blessed Mother.

Cittadini's reputation increased as the decades went on due to her fame as a passionate and inspiring educator who instilled in girls both a civic and a religious education that was the basis of her educational career and her beliefs.

Her beatification was celebrated on 29 April 2001 once Pope John Paul II recognized a healing that was believed to be attributed to Cittadini's direct intercession. Her feast is celebrated on an annual basis on the date of her death.

== Life ==
Caterina Cittadini was born in Bergamo on 28 September 1801 to Giovanni Battista Cittadini and Margherita Lanzani; her sister was Giuditta (1803-1840). She was baptized the following 30 September in the parish of San Alessandro in Colonna. Her mother died in 1808 and her father abandoned the sisters after being widowed.

The sisters were taken in and grew up in the orphanage of Bergamo where both sisters developed a strong and ardent faith; in her case it meant a strong devotion to both the Blessed Mother and to Jerome Emiliani. The sisters left the orphanage in 1823 in order to live with their paternal priest cousins Giovanni and Antonio Cittadini in Calolzio.

Cittadini became a teacher at a public girls school in Somasca in 1824 at the time she and Giuditta felt called to the religious life. Their spiritual director Giuseppe Brena - from their time at the orphanage - advised them to remain in Somasca to instead become the basis of a new religious congregation devoted to the education of girls both children and adolescents. To that end the pair bought in 1826 a house in Somasca and also bought and furnished a building that became a female boarding school in October 1826. Cittadini taught the students religious education and managed the school on a simultaneous level; at this stage word of her success spread and she attracted dozens of students from the surrounding areas. The Cittadini sisters opened two private schools in 1832 and in 1836.

Giuditta directed these schools until her sudden death in 1840 which had put an emotional strain upon her older sister. This was exacerbated with the death of her cousin Antonio in 1841 and her spiritual director not long after that. The rapid losses that she incurred ruined her health to the point where she neared death in 1842 but she believed she was cured through the intercession of Jerome Emiliani.

She quit public teaching in 1845 in order to just manage the schools themselves and she also took three companions under her wing to assist her in both that task and also in the care of orphans. In 1850 she received the papal approval of Pope Pius IX to build a chapel to house the Eucharist at her boarding school and in 1851 applied for the approval of a new religious congregation to the Bishop of Bergamo Carlo Gritti Morlacchi. In 1854 the new Bishop Pietro Luigi Speranza encouraged her work and instructed her to write the Rule of her new order - her first attempt was based on those of the Milanese Ursulines and was rejected. She persisted in writing the Rule once more which was accepted on 17 September 1854 bearing the name of her new congregation.

Cittadini died in 1857 after a period of ill health; her reputation for holiness and for her ardent faith spread across the northern Italian cities and led to calls for her cause of beatification to be introduced.

=== Post-mortem ===
Six months after her death - on 14 December 1857 - the Bishop of Bergamo gave his approval for the order to be recognized of diocesan right while on 8 July 1927 the congregation received the official papal approval of Pope Pius XI; this meant the congregation was now universal and was recognized of pontifical right to exercise its functions.

The order now operates in Asia in nations such as India and the Philippines and in Europe in both Belgium and Switzerland amongst others.

== Beatification ==
The process for beatification commenced on 21 April 1967 under Pope Paul VI with the title Servant of God being bestowed upon her. Preparations for the cause commenced at this point and all culminated in the diocesan process in which her life and her works were investigated; this complex process spanned from 5 August 1971 until 14 December 1978. Her writings were placed under investigation in order to ensure her beliefs and her life itself was not in contradiction to the teachings of the Roman Catholic Church and were approved in 1981.

Historical consultants met to discuss the cause on 19 December 1989 and had to issue their approval to it - which did take effect - in order for the cause to proceed to the so-called "Roman Phase" in Rome; this would see the Congregation for the Causes of Saints launching their own line of investigation into Cittadini's life and virtues. The Positio - documenting both her virtues and life - was submitted to the latter in 1990 while the diocesan process was ratified on 19 September 1991.

On 17 December 1996 she was proclaimed to be Venerable after Pope John Paul II acknowledged the fact that Cittadini had indeed lived a model Christian life of heroic virtue which she exercised to a favorable degree.

The miracle required for her beatification was investigated on a local level and was ratified in 1997. It received papal approval on 20 December 1999 and allowed for the beatification to take place. John Paul II celebrated Cittadini's beatification on 29 April 2001.
