= Domninus of Grenoble =

Saint Domninus of Grenoble (French: Domnin; d. 386) was the first recorded bishop of Grenoble. He is venerated as a saint by the Roman Catholic Church and by the Orthodox Church; his feast day is celebrated on 2 November in the Roman Catholic Church and on 5 November in the Orthodox Church.

== Life ==
His arrival as the first bishop of Grenoble, appointed by the Emperor Gratian, coincided with the renaming of the then village of Cularo to Gratianopolis, as Grenoble was previously known.

He participated in 381 in the Council of Aquileia, which condemned Arianism.

After his death in 386, he was probably buried in the first mausoleums on the site of the later church of Saint-Laurent, which became the Grenoble Archaeological Museum in the late 20th century, although there is now no evidence of this.
