= Ceratus of Grenoble =

Saint Ceratus of Grenoble (French: Cérat de Grenoble; also Ceras or Gerase) was a 5th-century bishop of Gratianopolis, now Grenoble. He is venerated as a saint by the Roman Catholic Church; his feast day is celebrated on 6 June.

He is commemorated in the placename Rue Saint-Cérat in Éauze.

== Life ==
Ceratus was bishop of Gratianopolis in Dauphiné, France, between about 441 and 450. During his episcopate he opposed the Arianism of the Burgundian invaders, by whom he was eventually driven into exile.

His relics were preserved in Simorre Abbey in the Archdiocese of Auch.
