= Vestiges of the Gallo-Roman wall, Grenoble =

Archaeological site in Grenoble, France

Vestiges of the Gallo-Roman Wall
- Vestiges de l’enceinte Gallo-Romaine (French)
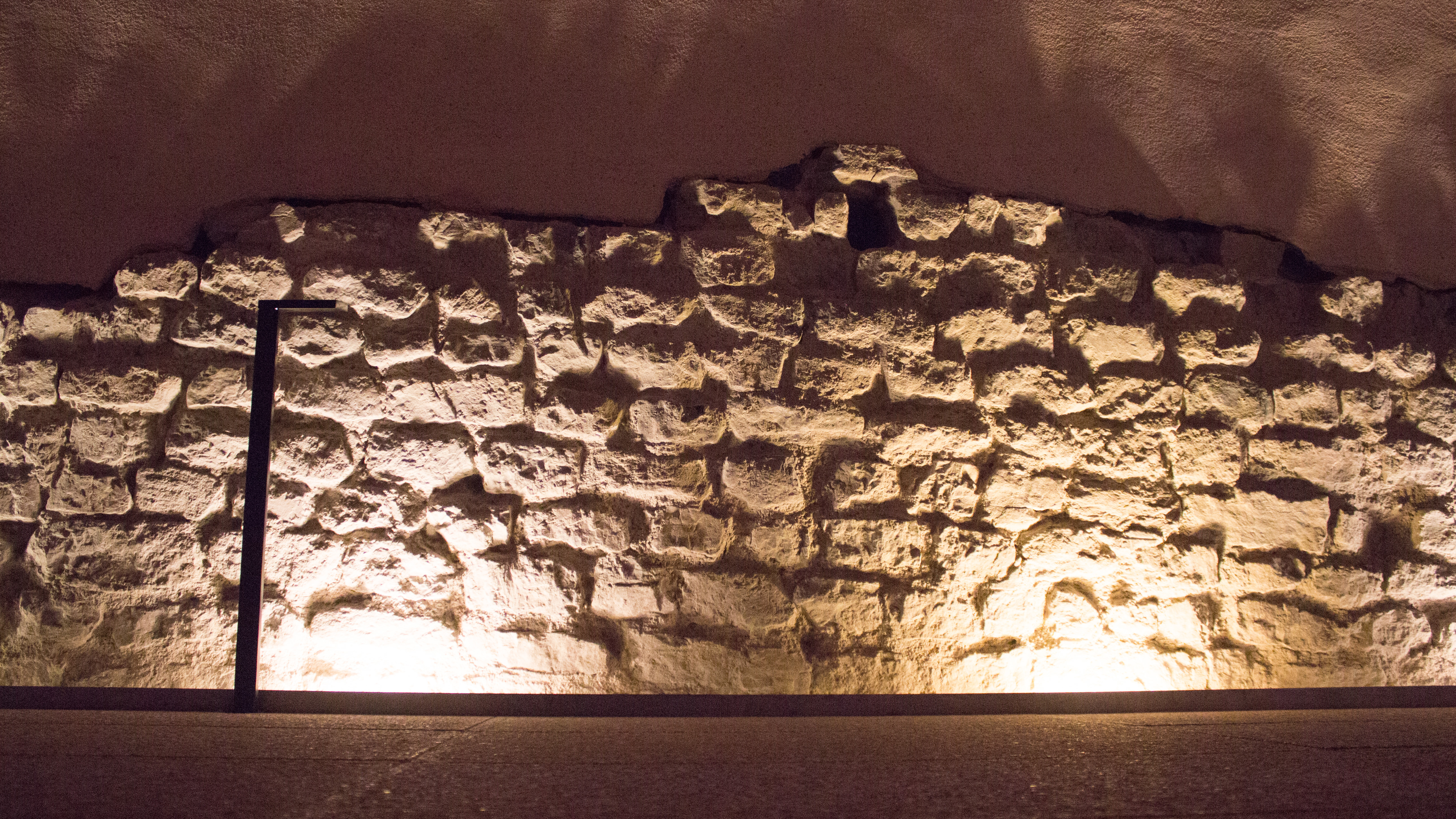
- The Vestiges of the Gallo-Roman Walls (Grenoble)

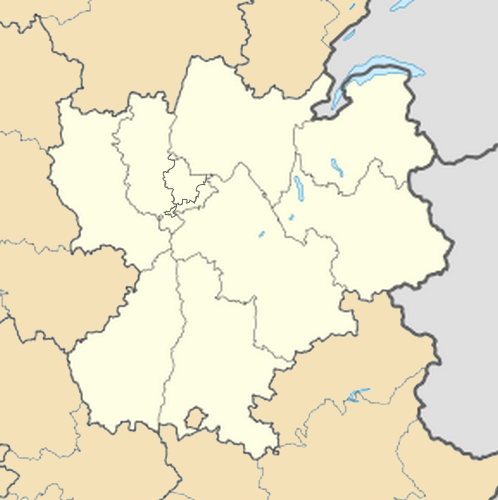
- Location of the Gallo-Roman Walls of Grenoble
- 45.19292°N 5.73208°E
- Type: Defensive wall and Status symbol
- Location: Grenoble, France
- Region: Rhône-Alpes
- Part of: Grenoble

History
- Built: 286-293 AD
- Built by: Roman Army

Site notes
- Material: Limestone; Pebble; Mortar
- Length: 1.5 km (0.93 mi)
- Width: Up to 4 m (13 ft)
- Area: 9 ha (22 acres)
- Condition: Remaining sections: Either semi-ruinous or partly restored
- Public access: Open to Public

Designations
- Designation: Cultural

The Vestiges (traces) of the Gallo-Roman wall are the remains of a fortification, constructed in Grenoble, France (formerly called Cularo) at the end of the 3rd century, under the reign of the Emperors Diocletian and Maximian. The status of Civitas marked the city of Cularo as an administrative capital of the Roman Empire. The Gallo-Roman wall was 1,150 meters in length, and had 39 semi-circular watchtowers which were 7.5 meters in diameter. It had two monumental gates decorated by inscriptions identifying the two Roman emperors. The Gallo-Roman wall played an important role in the protection of the 9-hectare urban surface of the Roman settlement. It served as a symbol of the status of Civitas. The wall was built up of small limestone blocks and was covered with plaster. Some parts of the wall were 4 meters thick and made up of limestone, pebble and tuileau rubble. These materials were held together by mortar.

== Construction ==
This defensive construction was between four and five meters thick. The two doors of the surrounding wall were built on stone blocks reused from previous buildings such as funerary monuments. Close to the foundation of the Viennoise door, inscriptions can be found on the stones, which attributes them to earlier funerary monuments. Vertically planted wooden stakes served as foundation for the construction. Every side of the wall was formed by a regular setting of rubble-stone. Inside, the blockage was composed of diverse materials, and covered in whitewash mortar. The initial height of the wall was approximately nine meters. The total length of the wall was close to 1200 meters, set up in the shape of an oval. This defensive structure had a ditch that was full of water, which linked it to the Isère (river) to form a protective moat.

== History ==
Prior to the construction of the wall in the end of the 3rd century AD, the Gallic city of Cularo (Grenoble) was surrounded by a fence and a ditch. During the Roman Peace (Pax Romana) period (27 BC to 180 AD), the walls were not guarded. In the 3rd century, the city was weakened by the invasion of barbarians, so the Gallo-Romans built a surrounding wall, under the rule of the Emperor Diocletian. The wall surrounding Cularo covered 9 hectares of land and had two main gates. At the time, the city had an approximate population of 2000 inhabitants. Cularo appears on the Tabula Peutingeriana, but in the Latin version of Cularone

In 1963 an appreciation of the structure of certain vestiges gained popularity. Nowadays, some traces of this rampart can be found in Grenoble, near the following locations: Hector Berlioz street; Lafayette street; Chenoise street; and, near the Grenoble Cathedral.

== Later Use ==
The Vestiges of the Gallo-Roman Wall are a landmark of Roman military heritage, signifying the culture of the Gallo-Romans in the city of Grenoble. Only the stone bonding remains today but the vestiges of one watchtower can be seen at the Musée de l'Ancien Évêché. The rest of the wall was demolished during the many expansion periods of the city, as it was torn down by the inhabitants of the city for building materials and to make space for new developments.

== Tourism ==
Located in the historical center of the city, close to the Grenoble Cathedral, the Musée de l'Ancien Évêché is now home to the main sources of public information on the Vestiges of the Gallo-Roman Wall. These Roman vestiges are classified as historical monuments since 1957.

== Gallery ==
The exhibit can be found at the Musée de l'Ancien Evêché in Grenoble, France.

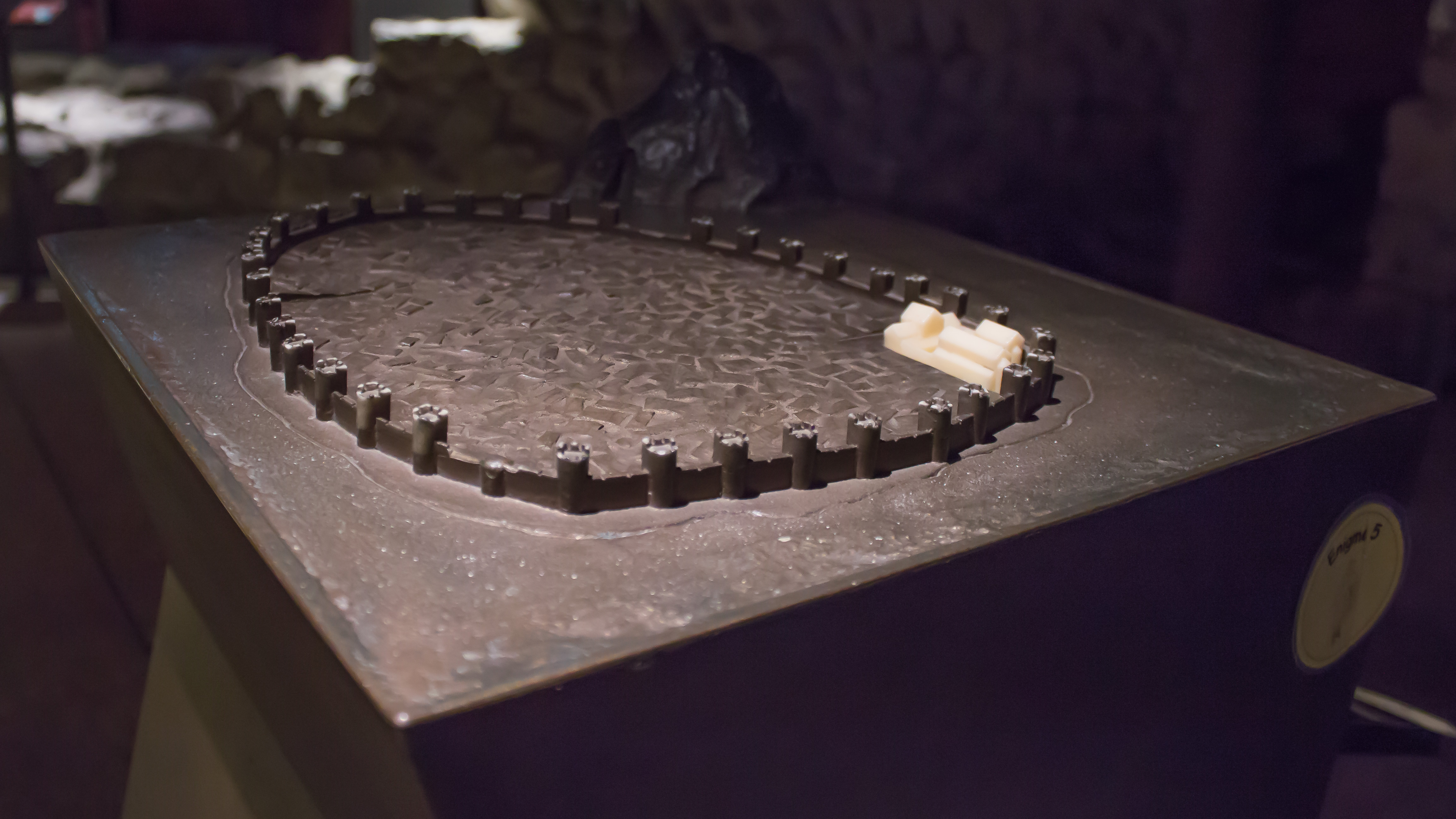
Model of the Gallo-Roman Walls that surrounded Grenoble.

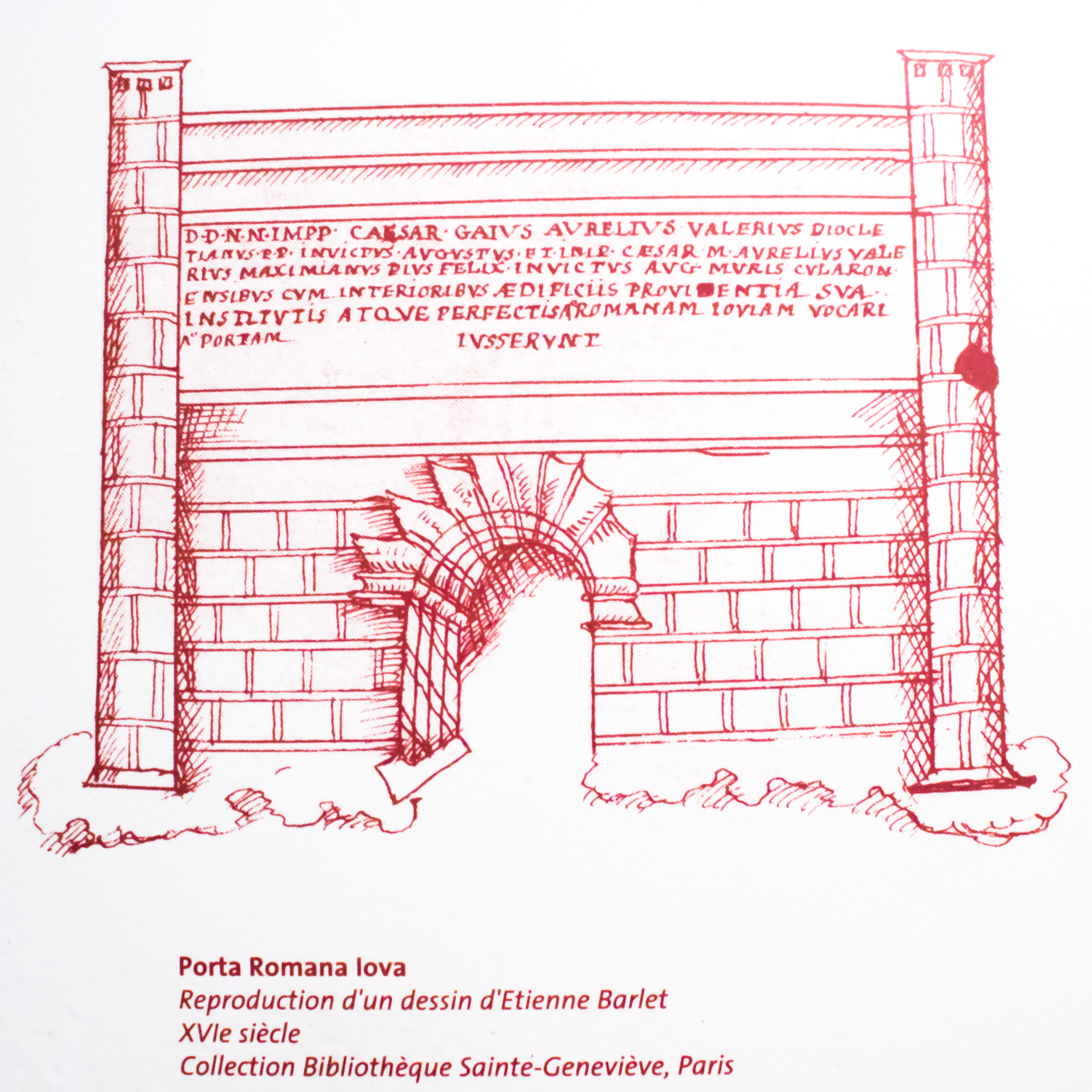
Porte Jovia or Traine: one of the two gates of the Gallo-Roman Walls that surrounded Grenoble.

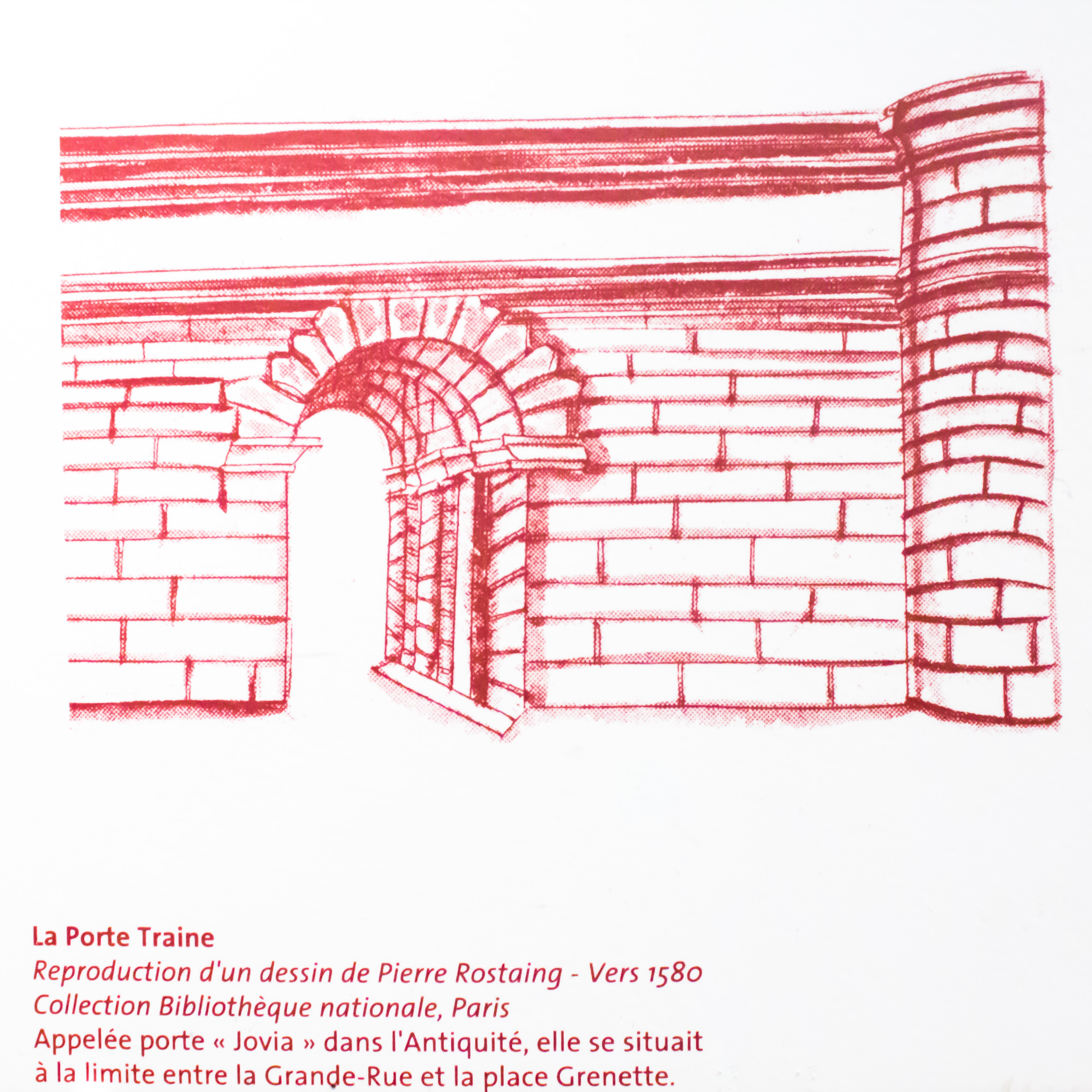
Porte Jovia or Traine: one of the two gates of the Gallo-Roman Walls that surrounded Grenoble.

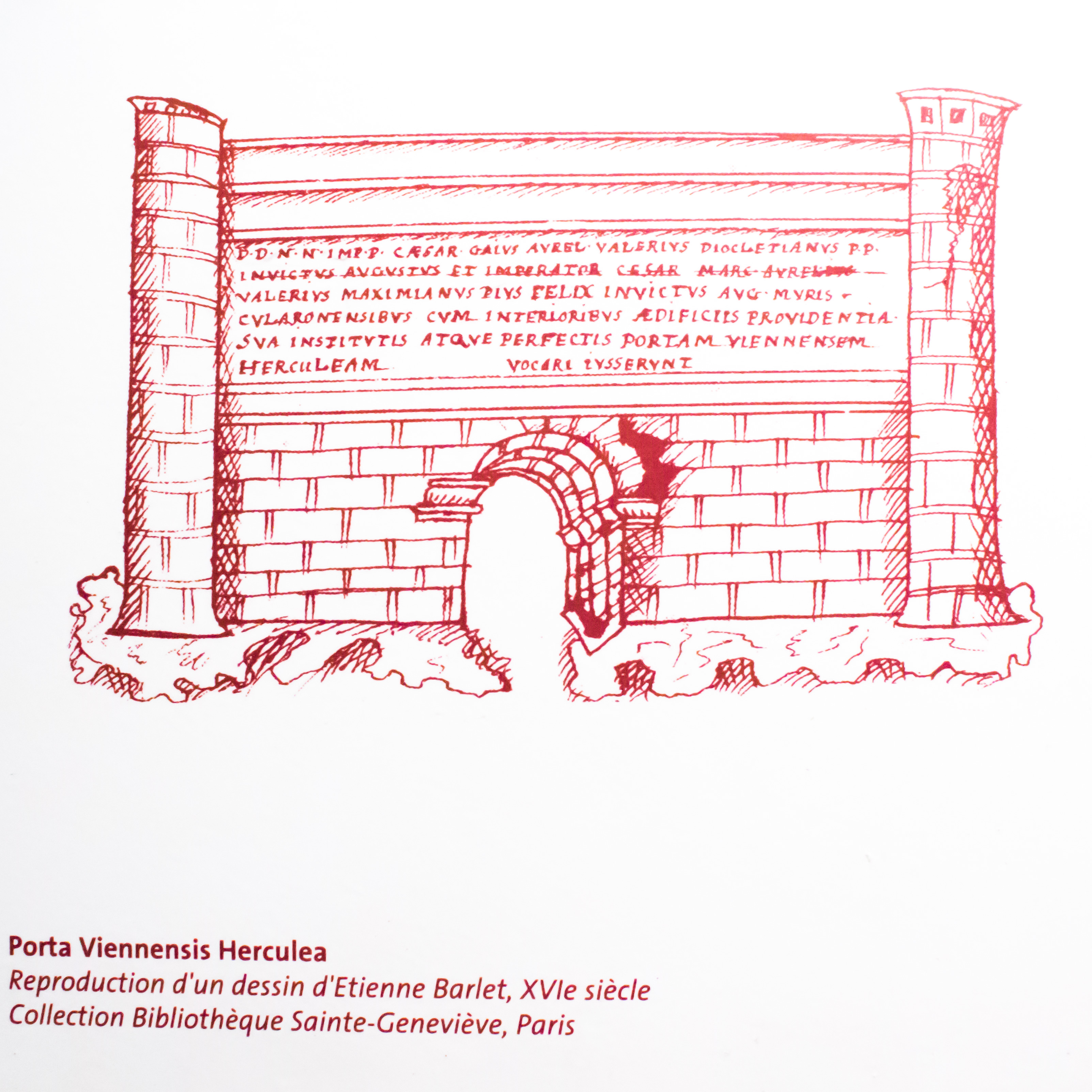
Porta Viennensis or Herculea: one of the two gates of the Gallo-Roman Walls that surrounded Grenoble.

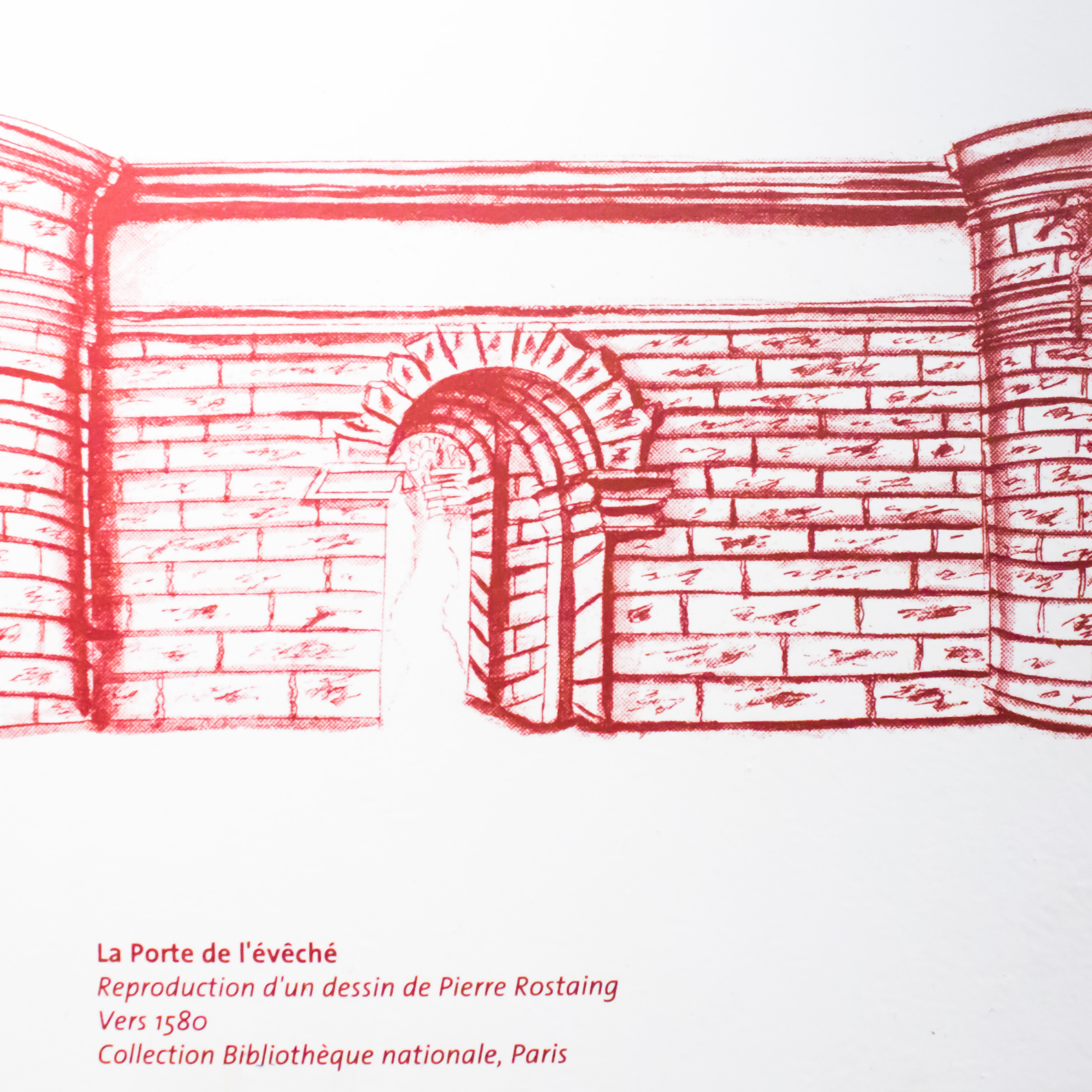
Porta Viennensis or Herculea: one of the two gates of the Gallo-Roman Walls that surrounded Grenoble.

== See also ==
- Cularo
- Grenoble
- Gallo-Roman culture
- Gallo-Roman enclosure of Le Mans

== Bibliography ==
Jacques-Joseph Champollion-Figeac, Nouveaux éclaircissemens sur la ville de Cularo, aujourd'hui Grenoble, J.B. Sajou, Paris, 1814

Woolf, Greg (1998). Becoming Roman : the origins of provincial civilization in Gaul (Repr. ed.). Cambridge: Cambridge Univ. Press. ISBN 9780521789820.

Pieters, Celine; Murray, Hélène; Bee, Stéphanie; Labourdette, Jean-Paul; Auzias, Dominique (October 2012). Best of France (2013 ed.). Jimjag. ISBN 9782746960084.

Jospin, Jean-Pascal; Rémy, Bernard (28 November 2013). Grenoble à l'époque gallo-romaine d'après les inscriptions (1st ed.). PUG (Presses Universitaires de Grenoble). ISBN 9782706119088.

Drinkwater, J; Elton, H (2002). Fifth-century Gaul: a crisis of identity?. Cambridge University Press.
