= Diocese of Grenoble-Vienne =

Catholic diocese in France

Diocese of Grenoble–Vienne-les-Allobroges Dioecesis Gratianopolitana–Viennensis Allobrogum Diocèse de Grenoble–Vienne-les-Allobroges

Catholic
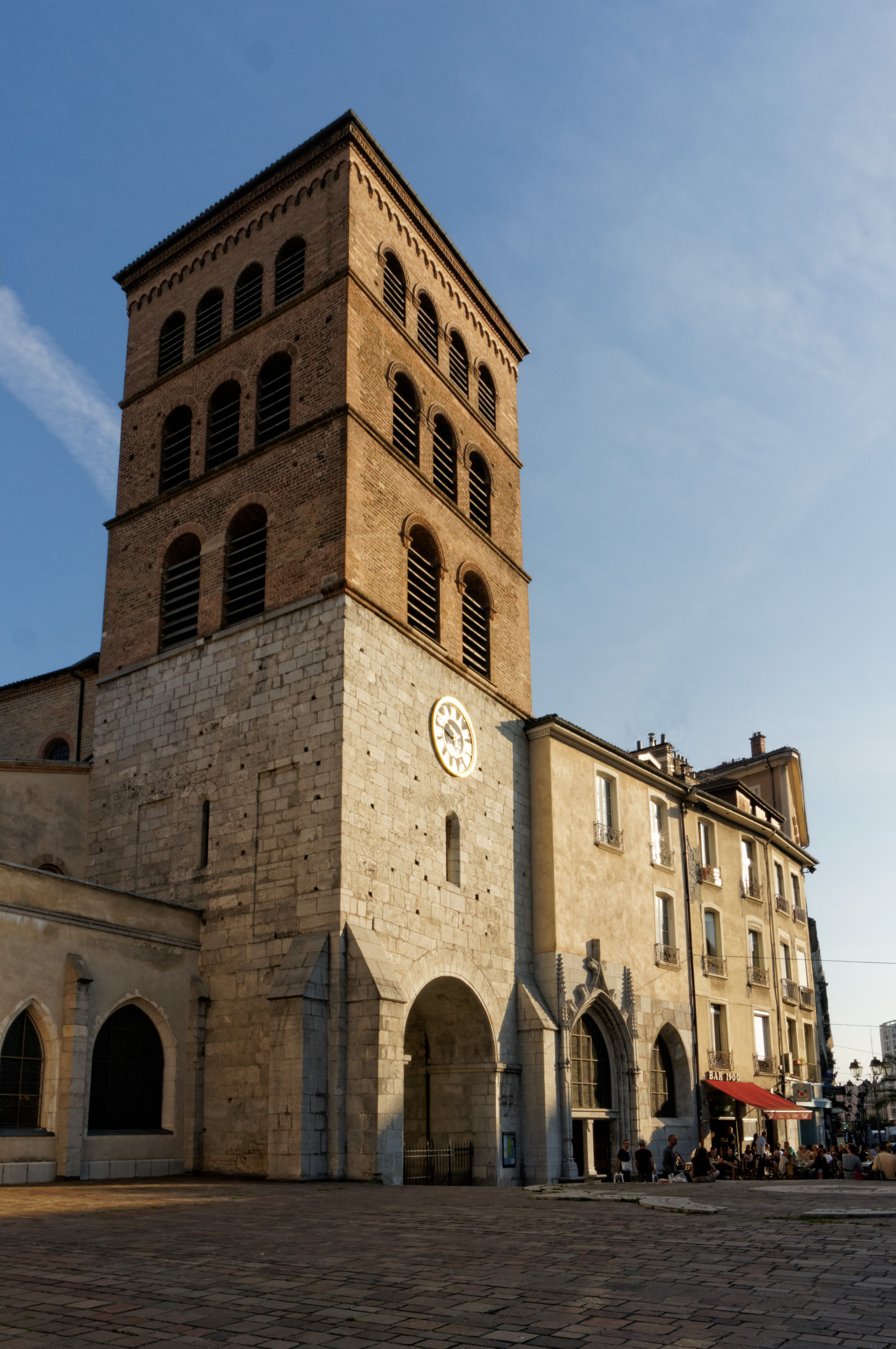
- Grenoble Cathedral

Location
- Country: France
- Metropolitan: Lyon
- Archdeaconries: Archdiocese of Lyon

Statistics
- Area: 7,467 km^{2} (2,883 sq mi)
- Population: Total; Catholics: (as of 2021); 1,288,000 (est.); 816,870 (est.) ▼
- Parishes: 47

Information
- Denomination: Catholic
- Sui iuris church: Latin Church
- Rite: Roman Rite
- Established: 4th Century
- Cathedral: Grenoble Cathedral
- Patron saint: Notre-Dame de l'Assomption
- Secular priests: 117 (diocesan) ▼52 (Religious Orders); 43 Permanent Deacons ▼

Current leadership
- Pope: Leo XIV
- Bishop: Jean-Marc Eychenne
- Metropolitan Archbishop: Olivier de Germay

Map

Website
- diocese-grenoble-vienne.fr

The Diocese of Grenoble–Vienne-les-Allobroges (Latin: Diocesis Gratianopolitana–Viennensis Allobrogum; Latin: Diocèse de Grenoble–Vienne-les-Allobroges) is a Latin Church diocese of the Catholic Church in south-eastern France. The diocese, erected in the 4th century as the Diocese of Grenoble, comprises the department of Isère and the former canton of Villeurbanne (Rhône), in the Region of Rhône-Alpes. In 2006, the name was changed from the diocese of Grenoble to the diocese of Grenoble–Vienne. The current bishop is Jean-Marc Eychenne, appointed on 14 September 2022.

== The diocese ==
Before the French Revolution Grenoble was a suffragan diocese of the Archbishopric of Vienne, and included the deanery of Savoy. In 1779, the deanery was made a diocese in its own right, with the episcopal seat at Chambéry.

Under severe pressure from First Consul Napoleon Bonaparte, Pope Pius VII issued the bull "Qui Christi Domini vices" on 29 November 1801. The bull first abolished all the metropolitan archdiocese and dioceses in France, and then recreated fifty of them, arranged in ten metropolitan ecclesiastical districts; the others were suppressed. In the metropolitanate of Lyon, the pope created suffragan dioceses of Mende, Grenoble, Valence, and Chambéry. Thirteen archipresbyterates of the former Archdiocese of Vienne were affiliated to the Diocese of Grenoble, and there were annexed to it some parishes from the then Diocese of Belley (now Diocese of Belley-Ars), the Diocese of Gap, the Archdiocese of Lyon, and the Diocese of Valence.

On 26 December 1970, in a reorganization of the ecclesiastical province of Lyon, the Diocese of Saint-Étienne was established, and the diocese of Grenoble lost to Lyon all its territory in the civil province of Rhône.

The diocese of Grenoble is in possession of an almost complete account of the pastoral visits made between 1339 and 1970, a palæographical record perhaps unique of its kind in France. Most of the records of the time before 1219 were destroyed in a flood and were only partially reconstructed.

The bishops of Grenoble held the monopoly on public bakeries (fours) in the diocese. In 1213, the people complained that the number of fours was too small for the needs of the population, and they petitioned Bishop Jean de Sassenage (1164–1220) to increase their number. The Dauphin heard of the situation and approached the bishop with an offer to finance the construction of two new bakeries in exchange for a half-interest in the profits. The bishop agreed.

Some historically important bishops of Grenoble were:

- Hugh of Grenoble (1080–1132), noted for his zeal in carrying out Pope Gregory VII's orders concerning reform and for his opposition to the Bishop of Vienne, later Pope Callixtus II. He presided over a diocesan synod held in December 1084, in which he and the synod issued a decree severely limiting access to the Grand Chartreuse. In October 1098, Bishop Hugh was in southern Italy, where he attended the council of Pope Urban II at Bari. On his return to Grenoble, he held another diocesan synod, at which he received the feudal oath of Count Guy, who had donated all the churches he controlled in the diocese of Grenoble and in other dioceses to the Church of Grenoble and its bishops.
- Pierre Scarron (1621–1667), who, with the co-operation of many religious orders, restored Catholicism in Dauphiné
- Jean de Caulet (1726–1771), who brought about general acceptance of the Bull Unigenitus, whose collection of books was the nucleus of the public library of the city

== History ==
Domninus of Grenoble, the first known Bishop of Grenoble, attended the Council of Aquileia in 381.

Shortly after 945, the territory and city of Grenoble were occupied by the Saracens. The bishop was obliged to flee with his treasures, and took up residence at the priory of S. Donat, in the Rhône just north of Valence. The Saracens were expelled in 965 by forces organized by Bishop Isarnus (949–990). After the threat was gone, Bishop Isarnus rebuilt the cathedral, and initiated a project to repopulate the city and the valley of Graisivaudan (Grévaudan). He settled people of all classes, and, since there were as yet no counts or other nobility in the neighborhood, the bishops became the lords of both the city and the valley.

On 15 September 1219, a disastrous flood struck the entire city of Grenoble and its suburbs. A dam upstream, which held back the waters of a large lake suddenly gave way and loosed a deluge down the Drac river. The octogenarian Bishop Jean de Sassenage wrote a pastoral letter, giving many details and imploring the people of the diocese to come to the aid of the victims.

=== Plague and schism ===
In 1348, the Black Plague reached the valleys of the Dauphinate, setting off unrest among the inhabitants. The principal victims of their fears were the Jews. The authorities did not move to protect the Jews, and instead the Dauphin Humbert actually encouraged the disorders. Many were massacred and despoiled of their property. In the city of Grenoble, 74 Jews were arrested, given trials, and condemned to be burned alive at the stake.

On 30 March 1349, the childless Humbert II of Viennois, the last of the Dauphins, sold his territory to Charles, the eldest son of the Duke of Normandy. The Dauphiné acquired a governor, a chancellor, and a parliament.

Humbert was named titular Latin Patriarch of Alexandria by Pope Clement VI on 3 January 1351, and was the consecrator of Bishop Rodolfe de Chissé of Grenoble on 23 February 1351.

in the Great Western Schism (1378–1417), France and Savoy chose to support the Avignon Obedience and its pope, Robert of Geneva, who was related to both ruling families. As Clement VII, he sought to lessen the civil discord which had enveloped Grenoble by transferring Bishop Rodolphe de Chissé (1350–1380) to the diocese of Tarentaise. He then appointed the papal Auditor Causarum François de Conzié (1380–1388). Conzié spent little time in Grenoble, due to his duties at the Roman Catholic Archdiocese of Arlese Roman Curia in Avignon, where he was named chamberlain of the Holy Roman Church in 1383. When he was promoted to the archdiocese of Arles, Pope Clement replaced him with the Benedictine monk Aymon de Chissé (1388–1427).

=== Protestantism ===
From the first half of the thirteenth century the French branch of the Waldenses had its chief seat in Dauphiné, from which country emanated Guillaume Farel, the most captivating preacher of the French Reformation. Pierre de Sébiville, an apostate Carthusian and then an apostate Franciscan, introduced Protestantism into Grenoble in 1522. The diocese was sorely tried by the wars of religion, especially in 1562, when the cruel François de Beaumont, Baron des Andrets, acted as the Prince de Condé's lieutenant-general in Dauphiné.

On 21 August 1615, the Protestant assembly met at Grenoble, and invited King Louis XIII to divert a journey to Bordeaux which he had just begun, to visit Grenoble.

In April 1628, to resist an uprising of Protestants, the Catholic officials of Grenoble took measures to strengthen the citadel and the fortifications of the city. On 11 August of the same year, troops which were being transferred to Italy in aid of the duke of Mantua passed through the valley of Grenoble; they left behind a pestilence which decimated the population. In February 1629, King Louis XIII led his army to Italy, spending several days in Grenoble. Requisitions of foodstuffs produced a famine later in the year.

Bishop Pierre Scarron (1620–1668) had begun the planning for a diocesan seminary, and had obtained letters patent authorizing him to proceed; but he died a few days after the letters were registered by the parliament of Grenoble, and it was left to his successor, Étienne Le Camus (1671–1707), to carry the project into realization. The seminary was at first installed in 1673 in the old priory of S. Martin-de-Miséré, under the direction of the Oratorians. Bishop Camus quickly came to the realization that the seminary should be in Grenoble, and he acquired the site of the Protestant church in Grenoble, which had recently been torn down. The priory of S. Martin became a minor seminary.

In 1745–1746, 300 Protestants were condemned to flogging, loss of noble status, prison, the galleys, and death by the parliament of Grenoble.

==== Jesuits ====
The two sojourns at Grenoble in 1598 and 1600 by Pierre Coton, the Jesuit, later confessor to Henry IV of France, produced many conversions from Protestantism to the Catholic Church. In memory of this, François de Bonne, Duke of Lesdiguières, the Constable of France, himself a convert in 1622, supported the idea of a Jesuit college in the diocese of Grenoble.

The Jesuits established a house in Grenoble in 1622, and attached to it a collège, which, by the end of the 17th century, had 27 teachers; there were 80–100 boarding students and 600–700 day students. By 1700, the institution included theological courses in its curriculum. Here Jacques de Vaucanson, the mechanician who invented the first all-metal lathe, studied.

Around 1673, however, Bishop Étienne Le Camus (1671–1707) became involved in a quarrel with Father Jean-Baptiste St. Just, S.J., the prefect of studies of the Jesuit college in Grenoble. Le Camus had lived at the abbey of La Trappe and at the Jansenist Port-Royal-des-Champs, and was friends and correspondents with Jansenists including Antoine Arnauld le Grand, François Dirois, Pasquier Quesnel, and Sébastien de Camboust de Pontchâteau, giving him a rigorist spiritual, though not Jansenist theological, outlook. From the first, Bishop Le Camus looked upon the Jesuits in his diocese as lax in behavior. He was also in conflict with the Jesuits in Chambéry. He attempted to get local Jesuit superiors to move St. Just to another house, but various people appealed to the parliament of Grenoble, to the Duchess of Savoy, and to the Jesuit General. Le Camus then excommunicated Saint-Just, who appealed to the parliament, an action which brought severe condemnation from the Father General for referring an ecclesiastical matter to a civil court. Though it was admitted that Saint-Just was innocent, he was forced to apologize. He continued to preach and hear confessions.

From the beginning of his episcopate, Bishop Le Camus was also involved in a struggle with the confraternities of his diocese. "Down here, all they know of religion is confraternities, indulgences and congregations." Over the decades since the beginning of the Reformation, the confraternities had become more secularized and more social in nature. Le Camus undertook to recall them to their religious purpose, through tighter supervision and more frequent pastoral visitations. As Joseph Bergin puts it, "...their disapproval of [the confraternities] inevitably appears as a form of killjoy puritanism."

On 21 March 1763, after an investigation lasting eight months, the parliament of the Dauphiné ordered that the Jesuits cease instruction in philosophy, theology, and the humanities. After further questioning, the parliament, on 29 August 1763, ordered the suppression of the Society of Jesus. The congregation was restored by Pope Pius VII on 7 August 1814, with the bull "Sollicitudo omnium."

=== The French Revolution ===
Pope Pius VI, when taken a prisoner to France on orders of the Directory, spent two days at Grenoble, from 7 July to 9 July 1799. The Constitutional Bishop of Isère, Henri Reymond, wrote to the pope, seeking an audience, but the letter was returned unopened, and no audience took place. The legitimate bishop, Jean-Marie du Lau d'Allemans, was living in exile, having refused to swear an oath to the French constitution. The pope was taken to Valence, where he died in prison on 20 August 1799. The French Directory, which had ordered his arrest and deportation, fell in the coup engineered by Talleyrand and Napoleon on 10 November 1799.

The coup resulted in the establishment of the French Consulate, with Napoleon as the First Consul. To advance his aggressive military foreign policy, which required him to make peace with the Catholic Church. Negotiations began immediately, and resulted in the Concordat of 1801 (July and August) with Pope Pius VII, which was highly favorable to Napoleon's interests. As under the ancien régime, the nomination to bishoprics belonged to the head of state, and the pope reserved the right to approve or reject the candidate. On 8 April 1802, Napoleon issued a decree, called the "Organic Articles", containing 76 items which he claimed were details, already implicit in the Concordat. They were not.

Particularly vexatious for all the bishops of France, but especially for Bishop Claude Simon of Grenoble, was the 26th article of the "Organic Articles," stating that "the bishops will make no ordination [of priests] before submitting the number of persons to the government for its acceptance." In a letter of 18 April 1809, Bishop Simon complained to the Minister of Cults, "For seven years that I have been bishop of Grenoble, I have ordained thus far only eight priests; during this period I have lost at least one hundred and fifty. The survivors threaten me with a more rapid gap; either they are infirm, bent with the weight of years, or wearied and overworked. It is therefore urgent that I be authorized to confer sacred orders on those who are old enough and have the necessary instruction." However, Napoleon controlled the number of priests ordained in France, and, in the view of Hippolyte Taine, he preferred military conscripts to seminarians or priests, forcing the bishops to appoint retired priests on state pensions, and even ex-constitutional priests. Recourse could not be had to Pope Pius VII, since the Papal States were annexed to the French Empire on 17 May 1809, the pope was arrested, and was deported to France.

Pius VII was kept under guard in the prefecture of Grenoble from 21 July until 2 August 1809, Bishop Claude Simon not being permitted even to visit him.

=== Religious orders in Grenoble ===
The Benedictines and Augustinians founded at an early date numerous priories in the diocese, that of Vizille dating from 994, but during St. Hugh's episcopal administration, monastic life attained a fuller development. The chapter-abbey of Saint-Martin de Miséré, whence originated many Augustinian priories, and the school of the priory of Villard Benoît at Pontcharra, were important during twelfth and thirteenth centuries.

The most notable monastic foundation of Dauphiné, contemporaneous with St. Hugh's regime, was the Carthusian Grand Chartreuse; it was founded in 1084 by Bruno of Cologne in a blind valley 20 mi (32 km) north of Grenoble. It was not subject to the ecclesiastical control of the bishops of Grenoble. The Frères du Saint-Esprit, who during the Middle Ages were scattered broadcast through the Diocese of Grenoble, did much to inculcate among the people habits of mutual assistance.

On 13 February 1790, the Constituent Assembly enacted a law forbidding the taking of vows, and all religious orders and congregations which employed vows were abolished.

In March 1880, in an official report to the President of the French Republic, the Minister of Culture, Charles Lepère, announced that there were more than 500 illegal congregations with more than 22,000 men and women in them. President Jules Grévy immediately signed a decree dissolving the Society of Jesus and ordering them to vacate their establishments within three months. All the other congregations and associations were allowed three months to follow the law of 1825 by registering in their departmental offices and seeking approval from the Council of State. These decrees were applied to the French colonies abroad as well.

Before the enforcement of the law of 1901 there were in the Diocese of Grenoble the following Catholic congregations: the Assumptionists, the Olivétans, the Capuchins, the Canons Regular of the Immaculate Conception, the Oblates of Mary Immaculate, Fathers of Holy Ghost and the Holy Heart of Mary, Brothers of the Cross of Jesus (absorbed in 1922 by the Clercs de Saint-Viateur), Brothers of the Holy Family, Brothers of the Christian Schools, and Brothers of the Sacred Heart. The diocesan congregations of women were: the Sisters of Our Lady of the Holy Rosary, devoted to hospital work and teaching, and founded by Cathiard, who, after having been an officer under Napoleon, died Archpriest of Pont de Beauvoisin; the Sisters of Providence of Corenc, founded in 1841, devoted to hospital duty and teaching (mother-house at St. Marcellin), and the Sisters of Our Lady of the Cross, likewise devoted to hospital and educational work, founded in 1832 (mother-house at Murinais).

=== Pilgrimage ===
The principal places of pilgrimage in the present Diocese of Grenoble are: Notre-Dame de Parménie, near Rivers, re-established in the seventeenth century at the instance of a shepherdess; Notre-Dame de l'Osier, at Vinay, which dates from 1649; and Our Lady of La Salette. The shrine of La Salette owes its origin to the reported apparition of the Virgin Mary on 19 September 1846, to Maximin Giraud and Mélanie Calvat; the devotion to Notre-Dame de la Salette was authorized by Bishop Bruillard on 1 May 1852.

=== Natives of Grenoble ===
Natives of what constitutes the present Diocese of Grenoble include: Amatus the Anchorite (6th century), the founder of the Abbey of Remiremont; and Peter, Archbishop of Tarantaise (1102–1174), a Cistercian, born at S. Maurice in the ancient Archdiocese of Vienne. Jean-Baptiste Vianney, later known as the Curé of Ars, was ordained a subdeacon in Lyon by Bishop Claude Simon of Grenoble (1802–1825) on 2 July 1814; and a priest in Grenoble on 13 August 1815.

== See also ==
- List of bishops of Grenoble
- Catholic Church in France
- Severus of Vienne

== Sources ==
- Gams, Pius Bonifatius (1873). Series episcoporum Ecclesiae catholicae: quotquot innotuerunt a beato Petro apostolo. Ratisbon: Typis et Sumptibus Georgii Josephi Manz. pp. 548–549. (Use with caution; obsolete)
- Eubel, Conradus, ed. (1913). Hierarchia catholica (in Latin). Vol. 1 (Tomus I) (second ed.). Münster: Libreria Regensbergiana. p. 301.
- Eubel, Conradus, ed. (1914). Hierarchia catholica (in Latin). Vol. 2 (Tomus II) (second ed.). Münster: Libreria Regensbergiana. p. 175.
- Eubel, Conradus, ed. (1923). Hierarchia catholica (in Latin). Vol. 3 (Tomus III) (second ed.). Münster: Libreria Regensbergiana.
- Gauchat, Patritius (Patrice) (1935). Hierarchia catholica (in Latin). Vol. 4 (IV) (1592-1667). Münster: Libraria Regensbergiana. p. 219.
- Ritzler, Remigius; Sefrin, Pirminus (1952). Hierarchia catholica medii et recentis aevi (in Latin). Vol. 5 (V) (1667-1730). Patavii: Messagero di S. Antonio.
- Ritzler, Remigius; Sefrin, Pirminus (1958). Hierarchia catholica medii et recentis aevi. Vol. 6 (Tomus VI) (1730–1799). Patavii: Messagero di S. Antonio.
- Ritzler, Remigius; Sefrin, Pirminus (1968). Hierarchia Catholica medii et recentioris aevi (in Latin). Vol. VII (1800–1846). Monasterii: Libreria Regensburgiana.
- Remigius Ritzler; Pirminus Sefrin (1978). Hierarchia catholica Medii et recentioris aevi (in Latin). Vol. VIII (1846–1903). Il Messaggero di S. Antonio.
- Pięta, Zenon (2002). Hierarchia catholica medii et recentioris aevi (in Latin). Vol. IX (1903–1922). Padua: Messagero di San Antonio. ISBN 978-88-250-1000-8.

=== Studies ===
- Bligny, Bernard (1960). L'église et les ordres religieux dans le royaume de Bourgogne aux XIe et XIIe siècles. (in French). Paris 1960. [Collection des Cahiers d'histoire publiée par les Universités de Clermont, Lyon, Grenoble 4].
- Bligny, Bernard (1979). Histoire des diocèses de France: Grenoble. (in French). Histoire des Diocèses de France, 12. Paris: Éditions Beauchesne. ISSN 0336-0539
- Duchesne, Louis (1907). Fastes épiscopaux de l'ancienne Gaule: Volume I. Provinces du Sud-Est. (in French). second edition. Paris: Fontemoing.
- Jean, Armand (1891). Les évêques et les archevêques de France depuis 1682 jusqu'à 1801 (in French). Paris: A. Picard. p. 520.
- Godei, Jean (1968). La reconstruction concordatane dans le diocèse de Grenoble après la Révolution (1802–1809). (in French). Grenoble 1968.
- Hauréau, Jean-Barthélemy (1865). Gallia christiana. (in Latin). vol. XVI, Paris 1865. (pp. 217–288; and "Instrumenta", pp. 73–100)
- Le Camus, Étienne (1868), Ulysse Chevalier. Catalogue des évêques de Grenoble. (in French). Grenoble: Imp. de Prudhomme, 1868.
- Luria, Keith P. (1991). Territories of Grace: Cultural Change in the Seventeenth-Century Diocese of Grenoble. Berkeley: University of California Press 1991.
- Marion, Jules (ed.) (1869). Cartulaires de l'église cathédrale de Grenoble dits cartulaires de Saint-Hugues. (in French and Latin). Paris: imp. Imperiale, 1869.
- Pisani, Paul (1907). Répertoire biographique de l'épiscopat constitutionnel (1791-1802) (in French). Paris: A. Picard et fils.
- Prudhomme, Auguste (1888). Histoire de Grenoble. (in French). Grenoble: A. Gratier, 1888.
- Rémy, Bernard; Jospin, Jean-Pascal (2006). Cularo Gratianopolis Grenoble. (in French). Lyon: Presses Universitaires Lyon, 2006.
- Solé, Jacques (1974). "La crise morale du clergé du diocèse de Grenoble au début de l'épiscopat de Le Camus," (in French), in: Jean Godel (ed.), Le cardinal des montagnes: Étienne Le Camus, évêque de Grenoble 1671–1707 (Grenoble 1974), pp. 179–209.

=== External links ===
- Centre national des Archives de l'Église de France, L'Épiscopat francais depuis 1919, (in French); retrieved: 24 December 2016.
- Goyau, Georges. "Grenoble", in: The Catholic Encyclopedia, Vol. 7 (New York: Appleton 1910), pp. 26–28.
