= Clerics Regular of Our Savior =

Roman Catholic religious congregation

The Clerics Regular of Our Savior (French: Clercs réguliers de Notre-Sauveur) were the members of a Roman Catholic religious congregation of Catholic priests founded in France in the mid-19th century dedicated to the education of the poor. The congregation disbanded in 1919.

== History ==
The congregation was founded in 1851 at the former Norbertine Abbey of Benoite-Vaux in the Department of Meuse.

The constitutions and spirit of the congregation were those of the Congregation of Canons Regular of Our Savior, which had been established in 1623 as a reform of the various canonical monasteries in the Duchy of Lorraine by Peter Fourier of the Abbey of Chaumousey, and confirmed by Pope Urban VIII in 1628. The scope of the reformed Order, as outlined in the Summarium Constitutionum of Fourier, was the Christian education of youth and the pastoral care of the poor and neglected. The congregation flourished exceedingly throughout the Duchy of Lorraine and made its way into France and the Duchy of Savoy, but was completely destroyed by the French Revolution.

In 1851, four zealous priests of the Diocese of Verdun, anxious to see revived the apostolic labours of the followers of Fourier, withdrew to the secluded site of the former abbey whose church had become the Shrine of Our Lady of Benoite-Vaux. There they began to follow religious life according to the Rule of Life given to his canons by Fourier. Three years later they received the approval of the Holy See, which changed their structure from that of Canons Regular, the form of the earlier congregation, to that of Clerics Regular. Its special work being the education of youth, during the next half of the 19th century the congregation spread and numbered several houses, including one in Verdun which later became a Carmel.

The members of the congregation were of three grades; priests, scholastics (seminarians), and lay brothers. Though possessing the title "clerics regular", they were not such in the strict sense of the word as their religious vows, though perpetual, were simple, according to the practice of the Roman authorities of establishing no new institutes of solemn vows.
