= Hugh of Châteauneuf =

Bishop of Grenoble and saint (1053–1132)

Saint Hugh of Châteauneuf
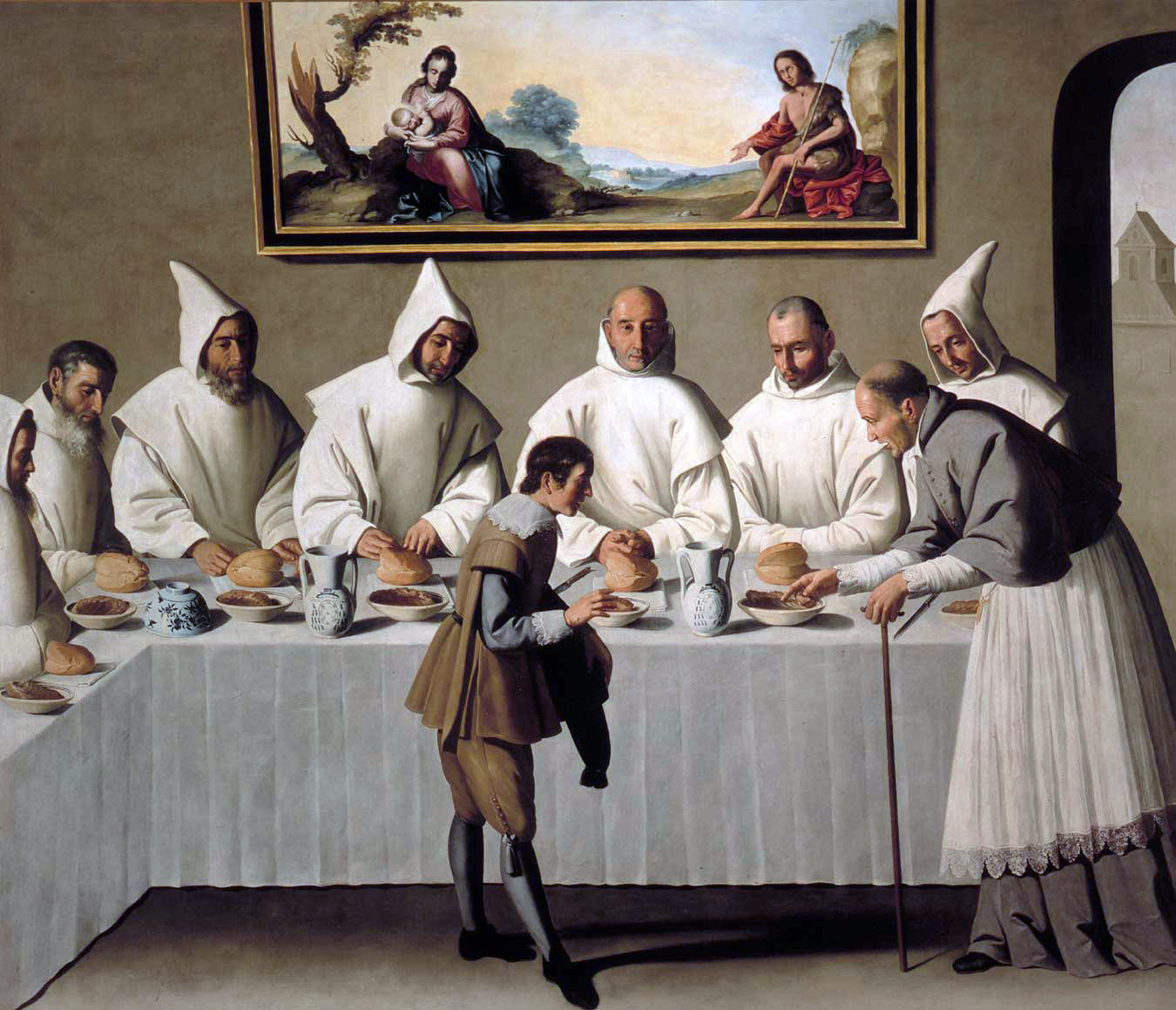
- Painting from the Carthusian cloister of Nuestra Señora de las Cuevas by Francisco de Zurbarán. The scene depicts Saint Hugh in a Carthusian monastery.

Bishop of Grenoble
- Born: 1053; Châteauneuf-sur-Isère, County of Albon, Holy Roman Empire (in modern France)
- Died: 1 April 1132; Grenoble, County of Albon, Holy Roman Empire
- Venerated in: Catholic Church
- Canonized: 22 April 1134, Rome, Papal States by Pope Innocent II
- Feast: 1 April; 22 April (Carthusian Order)
- Attributes: Lantern, three flowers
- Patronage: Grenoble, headache sufferers

Hugh of Châteauneuf (French: Hugues de Châteauneuf, 1053 – 1 April 1132), also called Hugh of Grenoble, was the Bishop of Grenoble from 1080 (Note: Various sources indicate 1078 or 1082.) to his death. He was a partisan of the Gregorian reform and opposed to the Archbishop of Vienne, later Pope Callixtus II.

== Biography ==
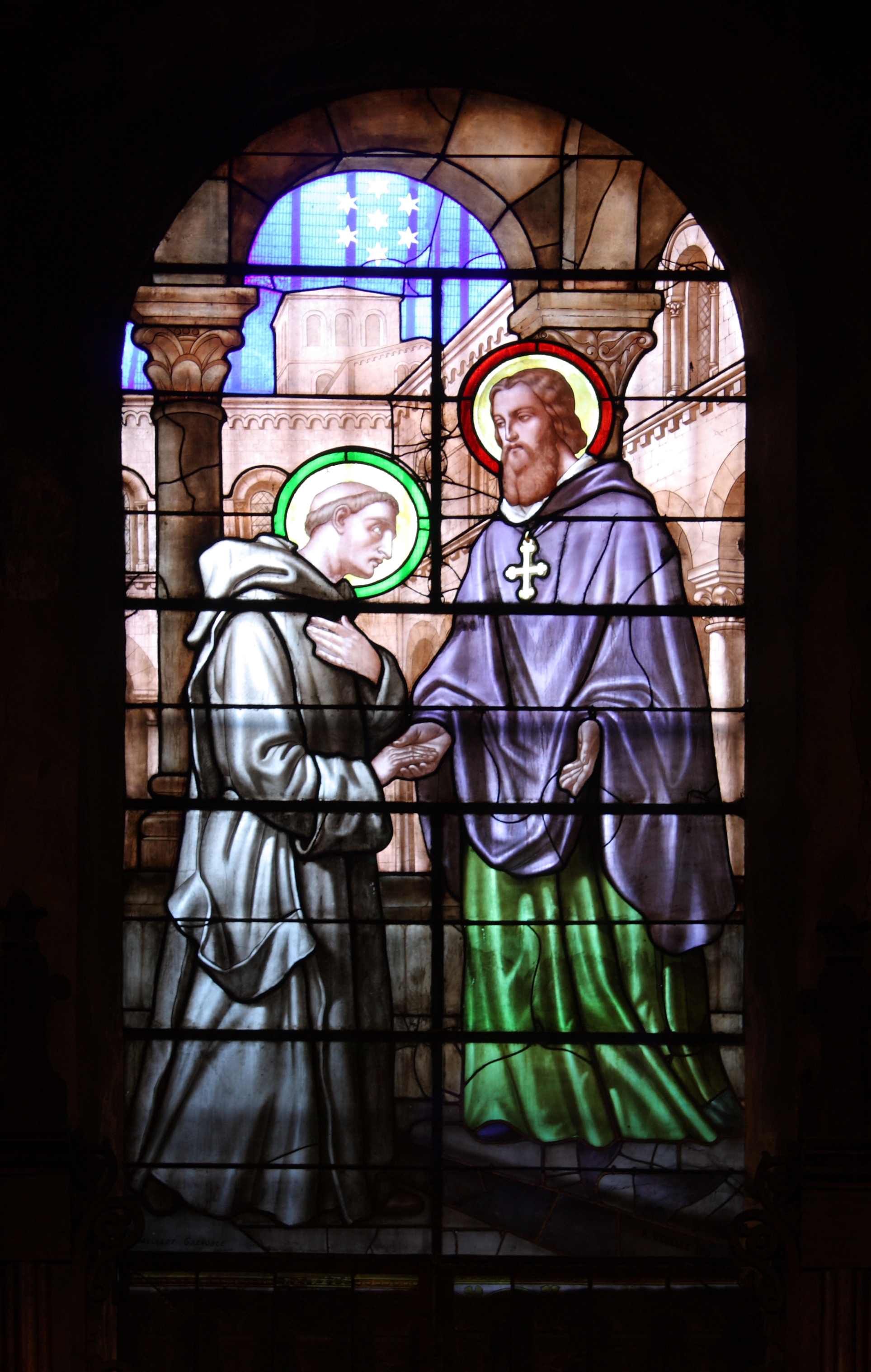
Hugh (right) on a stained glass window in Grenoble Cathedral; Bruno of Cologne is on the left.

Born at Châteauneuf-sur-Isère, County of Albon to Odilo of Valence, Hugh showed piety and theological facility from a young age. While still a layman, Hugh was made a canon of Valence. His piety was such that it was said of him that he only knew one woman by sight.

At the Council of Avignon in 1080, he was elected bishop of Grenoble, though he was not yet ordained. The See of Grenoble had fallen into a very poor state and Hugh was selected to be its Gregorian renovator. Conducted by a papal legate to Rome, Hugh was ordained by Pope Gregory VII himself. Upon his return, he immediately set to the task of reforming the abuses in his new diocese. When he had succeeded in countering abuse and fostering devotion after two years, he tried to resign his bishopric and enter the Benedictine monastery at Cluny. However, the Pope ordered him to continue his episcopal work.

For the rest of the 11th century, his episcopate was marked by strife with Count Guigues III of Albon over the possession of ecclesiastic lands in the Grésivaudan, a valley in the French Alps. Hugh alleged that the Count had usurped the lands from the bishopric of Grenoble with the help of Bishop Mallen of Grenoble. An accord was finally reached between Hugh and Count Guigues only in 1099. The Count agreed to cede the disputed territories while Hugh acceded to the Count's temporal authority within the vicinity of Grenoble.

Hugh was also instrumental in the foundation of the Carthusian Order. He received Bruno of Cologne, perhaps his own teacher, and six of his companions in 1084, after seeing them under a banner of seven stars in a dream. Hugh installed the seven in a snowy and rocky Alpine location called Chartreuse. They founded a monastery and devoted their lives to prayer and study, being oft visited by Hugh, who was reported to have adopted much of their way of life. Hugh also founded the nearby Monastère de Chalais, which grew into an independent order.

== Legacy ==
Hugh was canonised on 22 April 1134 by Pope Innocent II, only two years after his death. His feast day is on 1 April in the Catholic Church. (Note: "The Feast day is on 22 April in the Carthusian Calendar.") During the French Wars of Religion (between Catholics and Protestants inspired by John Calvin, called "Huguenots"), the Huguenots burned his body.

Sant'Ugo, a Roman titular church, was dedicated to him in 1991. He also gives his name to a church in Greenbelt, Maryland, United States.
