= Grenoble Cathedral =

Roman Catholic church in Grenoble, France

Coordinates: 45°11′33″N 5°43′56″E

Grenoble Cathedral Cathédrale Notre-Dame de Grenoble
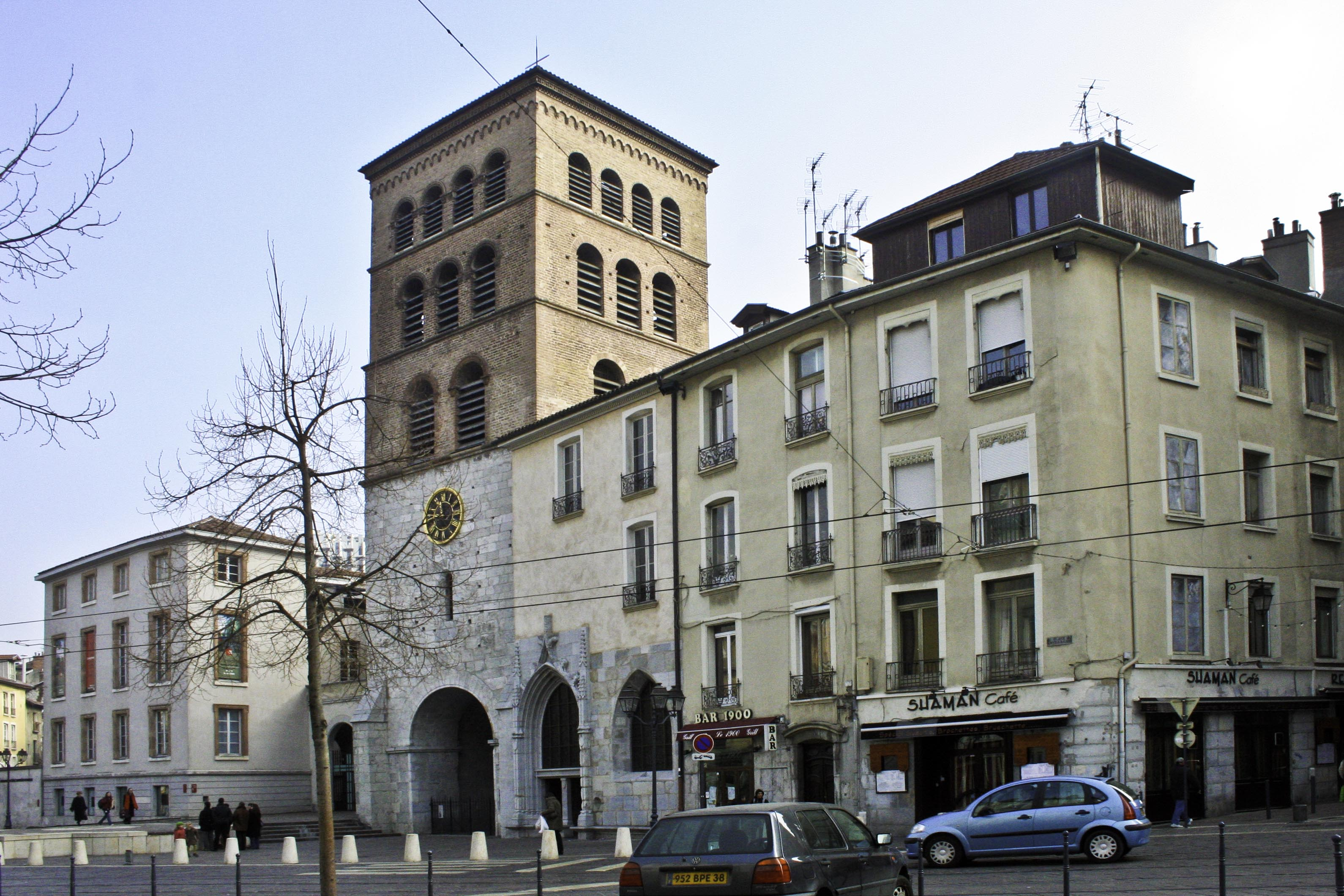
- Grenoble Cathedral

Religion
- Affiliation: Roman Catholic
- Province: Bishop of Grenoble
- Region: Isère
- Rite: Roman Rite
- Ecclesiastical or organisational status: Cathedral
- Status: Active

Location
- Location: Grenoble, France
- Interactive map of Grenoble Cathedral; Cathédrale Notre-Dame de Grenoble

Architecture
- Type: church
- Groundbreaking: 10th century
- Completed: 19th century

Grenoble Cathedral (French: Cathédrale Notre-Dame de Grenoble) is a Roman Catholic church located in the town of Grenoble, France. It is a national monument, and is the seat of the Bishop of Grenoble (since 2006 Bishop of Grenoble–Vienne).

== History ==
The first mention of Cathédrale Notre-Dame date from 902, during the episcopate of Isaak, but the Cathedral and the Church of St. Hugh have been rebuilt in the mid-thirteenth century.

Some remarkable examples of Renaissance art can be found in the cathedral, including a 15th Ciborium in the flamboyant Gothic style. Unfortunately the Ciborium was damaged in 1562 by baron des Adrets, during the Wars of Religion.

The cathedral was entirely remodelled during the 19th Century by the diocesan architect Alfred Berruyer. The innovative concrete facing added by Berruyer was removed in 1990 to reveal the original Roman facade.

== See also ==
- Vestiges of the Gallo-Roman wall, Grenoble
