= Châteauneuf-sur-Isère =

Châteauneuf-sur-Isère Chasteunuòu d'Isèra (Occitan)
- Commune
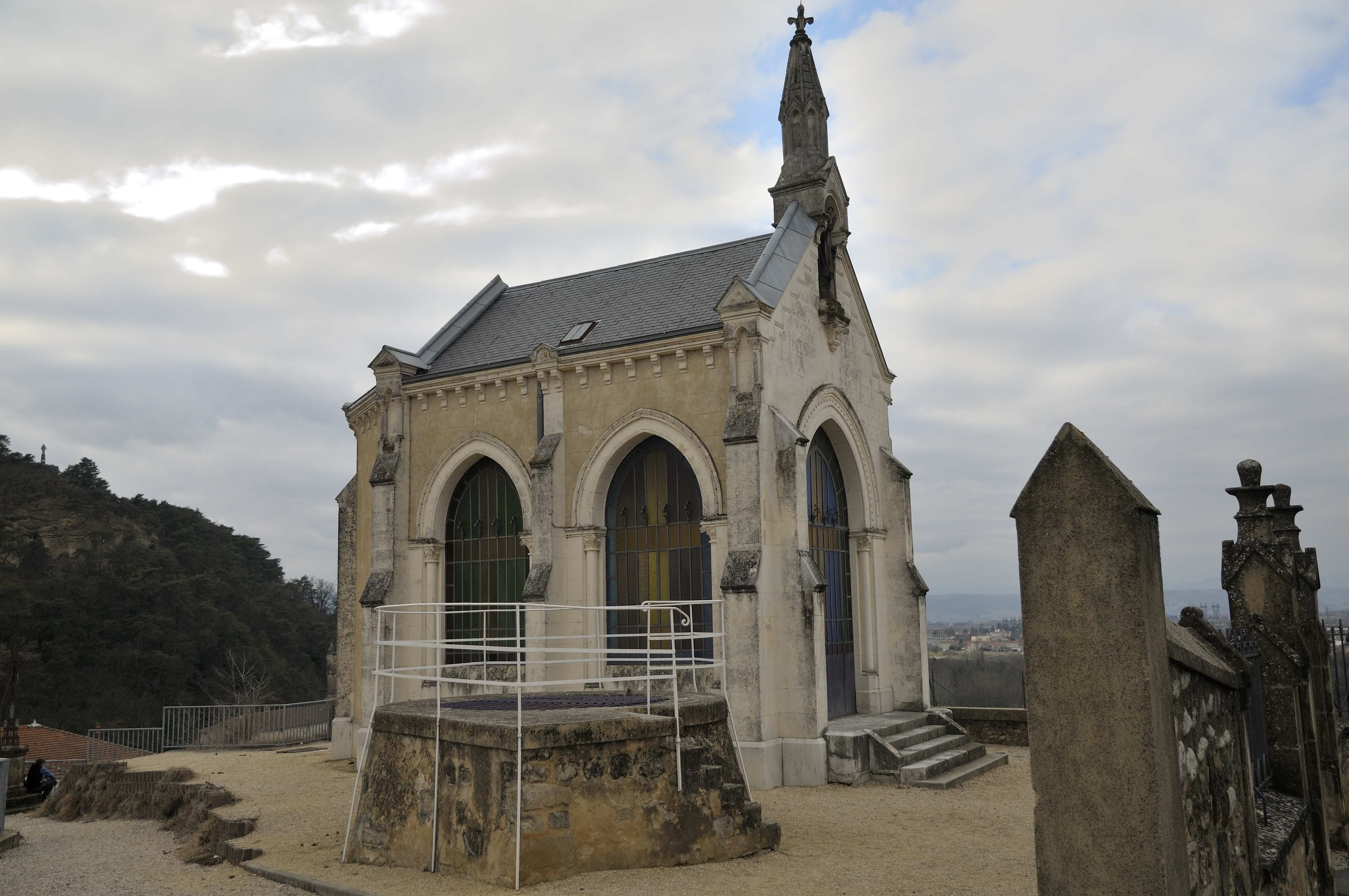
- The chapel of Saint Hugues

- Coat of arms
- Location of Châteauneuf-sur-Isère
- Location within France Location within Auvergne-Rhône-Alpes
- Coordinates: 45°00′53″N 4°56′07″E
- Country: France
- Region: Auvergne-Rhône-Alpes
- Department: Drôme
- Arrondissement: Valence
- Canton: Tain-l'Hermitage
- Intercommunality: CA Valence Romans Agglo

Government
  - Mayor (2025–2026): Agnès Jaubert
- Area^{1}: 45.57 km^{2} (17.59 sq mi)
- Elevation: 155 m (509 ft)
- Highest elevation: 237 m (778 ft)
- Lowest elevation: 111 m (364 ft)
- Population (2023): 4,281
  - Density: 93.94/km^{2} (243.3/sq mi)
- Demonym: Châteauneuvois
- Time zone: UTC+01:00 (CET)
  - Summer (DST): UTC+02:00 (CEST)
- INSEE/Postal code: 26084 /26300
- Website: www.chateauneufsurisere.fr
- ^{1} French Land Register data, which excludes lakes, ponds, glaciers > 1 km^{2} (0.386 sq mi or 247 acres) and river estuaries.

Châteauneuf-sur-Isère (French: [ʃɑtonœf syʁ izɛʁ]; Vivaro-Alpine: Chasteunuòu d'Isèra) is a commune in the Drôme department in southeastern France. Its name translates to "new castle on Isère".

== Population ==
Historical population
Year	Pop.	±% p.a.
1968	2,150	—
1975	2,012	−0.94%
1982	2,591	+3.68%
1990	3,031	+1.98%
1999	3,285	+0.90%
2007	3,621	+1.22%
2012	3,790	+0.92%
2017	3,875	+0.44%
2023	4,281	+1.67%
Source: INSEE

== Personalities ==
It was the birthplace of St Hugh of Châteauneuf.

== See also ==
- Communes of the Drôme department
