= Cularo =

Gallic city of Grenoble until 381

Coordinates: 45°11′32″N 5°43′50″E

Cularo was the name of the Gallic city which evolved into modern Grenoble. It was renamed Gratianopolis in 381 to honor Roman emperor Gratian.

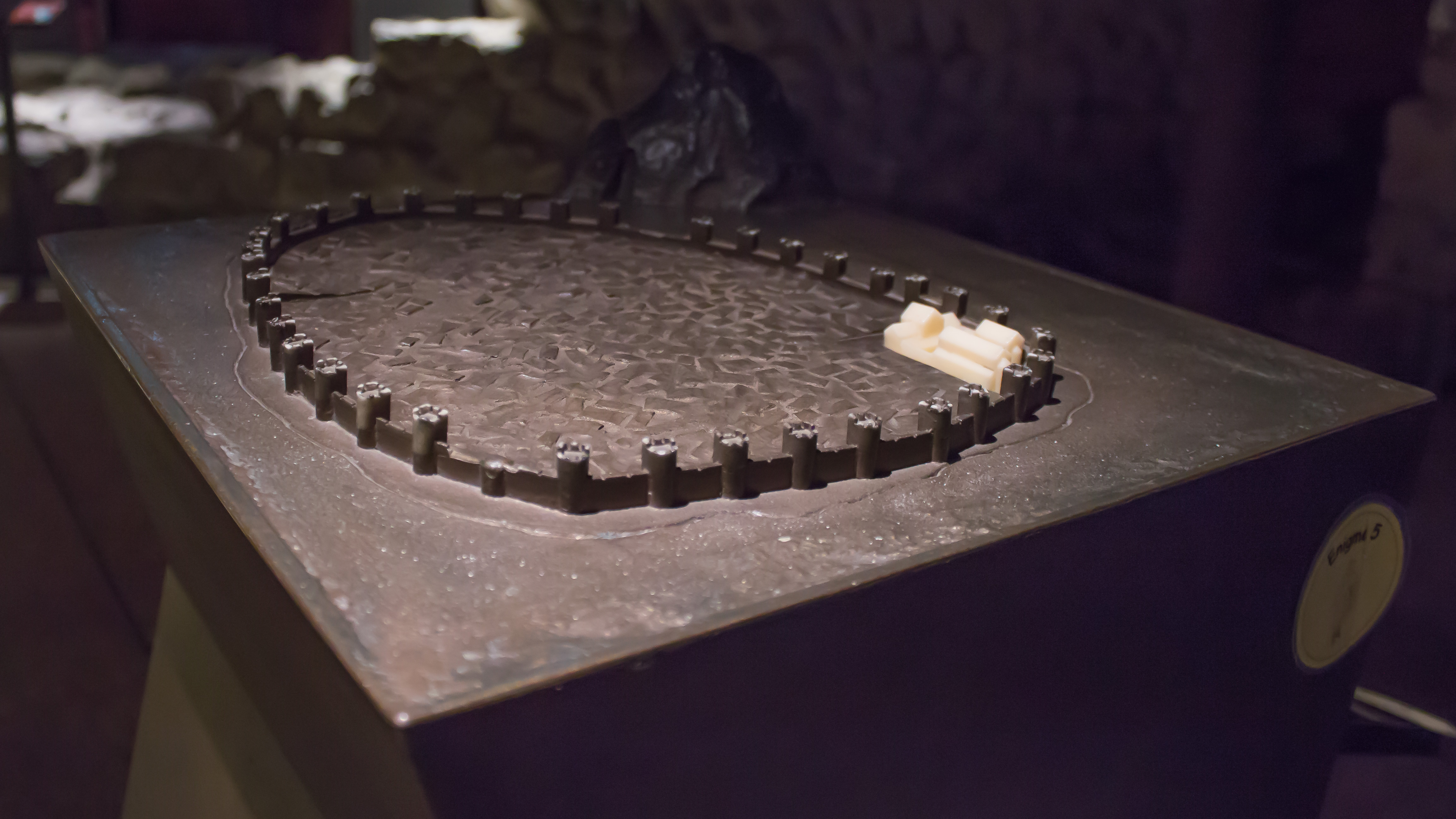
Model of the Gallo-Roman Walls that surrounded Cularo from the end of the 3rd century on.

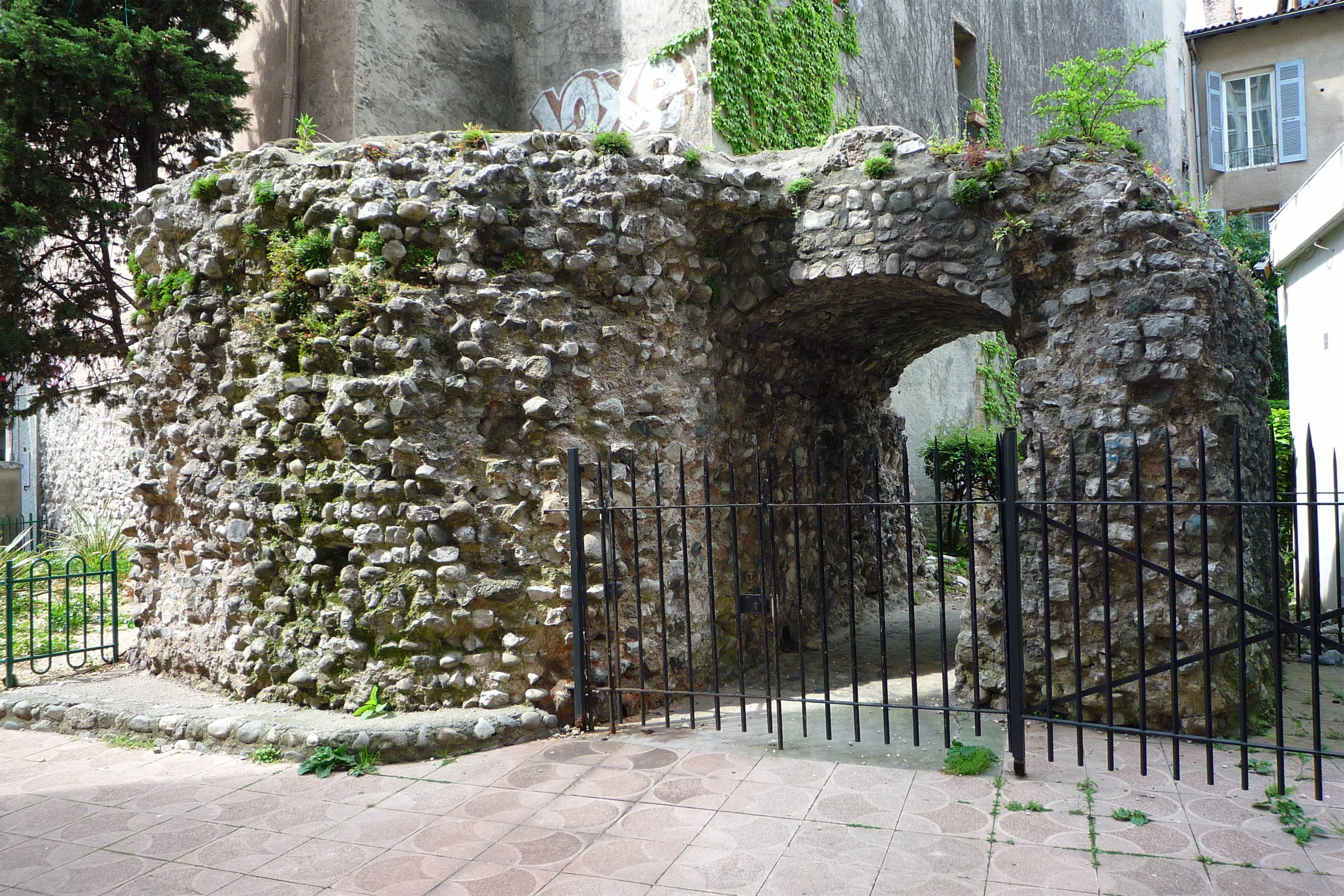
Remnants of the Roman walls of Cularo

The earliest remaining reference to what is now Grenoble dates back to a July 43 BC letter written by Munatius Plancus to Cicero. The small town founded by the Allobroges Gallic people was at that time called Cularo. In 292, the western emperor Maximian elevated the town to the rank of Civitas, "city", and ordered the construction of defensive walls which both protected the urban area and marked its higher status. Their vestiges are now a landmark of this era.

Wishing to thank and honor the emperor Gratian for creating its bishopric, the inhabitants of Cularo renamed their town Gratianopolis in 381. That name would subsequently evolve into Grenoble through Graignovol.

The Saint-Laurent crypt and the baptistery of Grenoble date also back from the Gallo-Roman period (4th century), and have been preserved to this day; the latter remained in use until the 9th century but had later been buried under accumulated urban layers; it was rediscovered in 1989 during the construction of tramway tracks, excavated until 1996, and incorporated into the adjacent Musée de l'Ancien Évêché. Several small sections of the Gallo-Roman city wall are also visible in the old town, especially in rue Lafayette.
