= Brothers of the Cross of Jesus =

French order of Roman Catholic monks

Brothers of the Cross of Jesus were a French order of Roman Catholic monks. It was founded in 1820 at Lyon, France, by Father C.M. Bochard, Doctor of the Sorbonne, Vicar-General of the Diocese of Lyon. Bochard was the first superior general (1820–1834). It grew during the 19th century in eastern France and in Switzerland, until the persecution of 1903, which destroyed nearly all its establishments. Brother Evariste with 32 religious were sent to establish a province in Canada under the patronage of André-Albert Blais, Bishop of Rimouski, in 1905.
