= Somaschi Fathers =

Catholic religious order

Order of Clerics Regular of Somasca
- Ordo Clericorum Regularium a Somascha
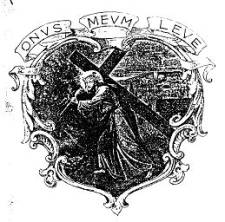
- Coat of arms of the Somascan Fathers
- Abbreviation: CRS
- Nickname: Somascans
- Formation: 1534; 492 years ago
- Founder: Jerome Emiliani
- Founded at: Venice, Italy
- Type: Order of Clerics Regular of Pontifical Right for men
- Headquarters: Generalate; Via Casal Morena 8, Morena - Rome, Italy
- Coordinates: 41°54′4.9″N 12°27′38.2″E
- Members: 517 members (includes 338 priests) as of 2024
- Superior General: José Antonio Nieto Sepúlveda
- Motto: Latin: Onus Meum Leve; English: Lighten my Burden
- Continents served: Europe, Americas, Asia Africa
- Parent organization: Catholic Church
- Website: https://somascans.org/
- Formerly called: The Company of the Servants of the Poor

The Somaschi Fathers, also known as the Somascans and officially as the Order of Clerics Regular of Somasca (Latin: Ordo Clericorum Regularium a Somascha), are a Catholic order of Clerics Regular of Pontifical Right for men. It was founded in Italy in the 16th century by Jerome Emiliani and named after the motherhouse at Somasca.

As of 2024, 517 Somascans served around the world. They provide staff for boys' homes, serve in 95 parishes, and engage in other ministries.

== History ==
In 1532, the priests Alessandro Besuzio and Agostino Bariso joined the charitable labors of Jerome Emiliani, a converted former soldier from Venice. Emiliani founded the religious order called the "Company of the Servants of the Poor" in 1534, calling together his collaborators and companions for a general assembly. This handful of laymen and priests adopted an organized structure for the movement of religious and social reform started by Jerome in 1529 in Venice. In the rule of this congregation, Emiliani stated the principal work of the community was the care of orphans, poor and sick.

Jerome placed the motherhouse at Somascha, a secluded hamlet between Milan and Bergamo. Devoted to the guardian angels, Emiliani entrusted the congregation to the protection of the Virgin, the Holy Spirit and the Archangel Raphael. The group was recognized by the papal nuncio to the Republic of Venice in 1535. Jerome Emiliani died on 8 February 1537, (and was canonized in 1767).

After the death of Jerome the community was about to disband, but was kept together by Angelo Marco Gambarana, who had been chosen superior. It was approved by Pope Paul III in 1540, and confirmed by Pius IV in 1563. In 1568 the community was constituted a religious order, according to the Rule of St. Augustine, with solemn vows, by Pius V with the name of Somascan Regular Clerics. At this time the first Constitutions were issued to define a common lifestyle for all its members, both lay and clergy.

In 1547, the Somascans were briefly united with the Theatines, but as the care of orphans was different from the purpose of the latter community, they separated in 1554. In 1569 the first six members made their profession, and Gambarana was made first superior general. Great favour was shown to the order by Archbishop of Milan Charles Borromeo, who gave it the church of St. Mayeul at Pavia, from which church the order takes its official name "Clerici regulares S. Majoli Papiae congregationis Somaschae".

Later the education of youth was put into the programme of the order, and the colleges at Rome and Pavia became renowned. It spread into Austria and Switzerland, and before the great Revolution it had 119 houses in its four provinces: Rome, Lombardy, Venice, and France.

== Activities ==
According to Vidimus Dominum the spirituality of St. Jerome consists in the desire to bring the Church "to the state of holiness" of the early Christian communities, serving Christ especially in poor, abandoned children and, showing them the tender "fatherhood and motherhood" of God.

The Order extended its charitable ministries beyond the care of orphans by supporting and staffing seminaries (just then mandated by the Council of Trent), by educating youth, and by ministering to people in parishes. Its expansion, however, was abruptly stopped by laws obstructing religious life issued by Napoleon in 1810 and by the Italian government in 1861. It was then persecuted until the beginning of the 20th century, when it resumed its expansion.

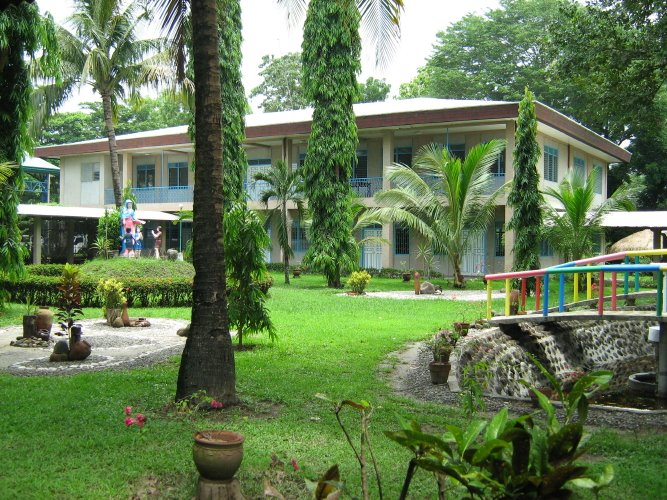
Somascan Fathers Seminary in Lubao, Pampanga, Philippines

The Somascans number about 500 religious. Members take vows of poverty, chastity and obedience. According to the Somascans' Web site, member are either priests or brothers living in communities, pursuing holiness by prayer and ministry to the poor, living in humility and kindness, loving poverty and work, praying to Jesus and Mary. They perform different ministries in the Church, such as the care of orphans, the disadvantaged and the poor; the treatment of at-risk youth; the rehabilitation of drug addicts; education; pastoral care and spiritual guidance; the pastoral care of minorities; foreign missions; and youth formation. They work in group homes, treatment and rehabilitation centers, retreat houses, schools, youth centers, and parishes.

The Somascans operate in:

- Europe: Italy, Spain, Poland, Romania, Albania;
- Americas: USA, Mexico, Guatemala, Honduras, El Salvador, Colombia, Ecuador, Brazil, Santo Domingo;
- Asia: the Philippines, India, Sri Lanka, Indonesia, Australia;
- Africa: Mozambique and Nigeria.

In the Philippines, the Somascans established the St. Jerome Emiliani School in Dinalupihan in 2017.

The Somascans arrived in Nigeria in 2010. There they work with children living on the streets and to address the problem of the trafficking of girls to Europe.

== Causes of Canonization ==
Saints

- Gerolamo Emiliani (c. 1486 – 8 February 1537), founder of the order, canonized on 16 July 1767

Venerables

- Giovanni Vittorio Ferro (13 November 1901 - 18 April 1992), Archbishop of Reggio Calabria, declared Venerable on 5 July 2019

Servants of God

- Federico Cionchi (15 April 1857 - 31 May 1923), professed religious, declared as a Servant of God on 15 October 1981
