= Cleric regular =

Catholic clergy belonging to a religious order

In the canon law of the Catholic Church, clerics regular or clerks regular are clerics (mostly priests) who are members of a religious order under a rule of life (regular). Clerics regular differ from canons regular in that they devote themselves more to pastoral care, in place of an obligation to the praying of the Liturgy of the Hours in common, and have fewer observances in their rule of life.

== Definition ==
Clerics regular are those bodies of men in the Church who while being essentially clerics, devoted to the exercise of the ministry in preaching, the administration of the sacraments, the education of youth, and other spiritual and corporal works of mercy, are at the same time religious in the strictest sense of the word, and living a community life according to a rule approved by the Holy See.

In the Corpus Juris Canonici the term "clerics regular" is often used for canons regular, and regular clerics are classed by authors as a branch or modern adaptation of the family of canons regular. This is because of the intimate connection existing between the two; for while separated from the secular clergy by their vows and the observance of a community life and a rule, they form a distinct class in the religious state, the clerical, in opposition to the monastic, which includes monks, and hermits.

Clerics regular are distinguished from the purely monastic bodies, or monks, in four ways:

- They are primarily devoted to the sacred ministry; not so the monks, whose proper work is contemplation and the solemn celebration of the liturgy.
- They are obliged to cultivate the sacred sciences, which, if cultivated by the monks, are yet not imposed upon them by virtue of their state of life.
- Clerics regular must retain some appearance of clerical dress. This does not forbid orders of clerics regular from wearing religious habits. It only requires that the habit of a cleric regular resemble clerical dress.
- Because of their occupations, they are less given to the practice of austerity which is a distinct feature of the purely monastic life. They are distinguished from the friars in this, as though friars are devoted to the sacred ministry and the cultivation of learning, they are not primarily priests.

== History ==
The exact date at which clerics regular appeared in the Church cannot be absolutely determined. Regular clerics of some sort, i.e. priests devoted both to the exercise of the ministry and to the practice of the religious life, are found in the earliest days of Christian antiquity. Many eminent theologians hold that the clerics regular were founded by Christ himself. In this opinion the Apostles were the first regular clerks, being constituted by Christ ministers par excellence of his Church and called by him personally to the practice of the counsels of the religious life (cf. Suarez).

From the fact that Augustine of Hippo in the 4th century established in his house a community of priests, leading a religious life, for whom he drew up a rule, he has ordinarily been styled the founder of the regular clerics and canons, and upon his Rule have been built the constitutions of the Canons Regular and an immense number of the religious communities of the Middle Ages, besides those of the clerks regular established in the sixteenth century. During the whole medieval period the clerics regular were represented by the regular canons who under the name of the Canons Regular or Black Canons of St. Augustine, the Premonstratensians, (known also as the White Canons or Norbertines), etc., shared with the monks the possession of large abbeys and monasteries all over Europe.

It was not until the 16th century that clerics regular in the modern and strictest sense of the word came into being. Just as the conditions obtaining in the 13th century brought about a change in the monastic ideal, so in the sixteenth the altered circumstances of the times called for a fresh development of the religious spirit in the Church. This development, adapted to the needs of the times, was present in the various bodies of simple clerics, who, desirous of devoting themselves more perfectly to the exercise of their priestly ministry under the safeguards of the religious life, instituted the several bodies which, under the names of the various orders or regular clerics, constitute in themselves and in their imitators one of the most efficient instruments for good in the Church Militant.

The first order of cleric regular to be founded was the Congregation of Clerks Regular of the Divine Providence, better known as Theatines established at Rome in 1524. Then followed the Clerics Regular of the Good Jesus, founded at Ravenna in 1526, and abolished by Pope Innocent X in 1651; the Barnabites or Clerks Regular of St. Paul, Milan, 1530; The Somaschans or Clerks Regular of St. Majolus, Somasca, 1532; the Jesuits or the Society of Jesus, Paris, 1534; the Clerics Regular of the Mother of God of Lucca, Lucca, 1583; the Clerics Regular, Ministers to the Sick (Camillians), Rome, 1584; the Clerics Regular Minor, Naples, 1588; the Piarists (Clerics Regular of the Mother of God of the Pious Schools), Rome, 1621; and the Marian Fathers of the Immaculate Conception of the Blessed Virgin Mary, Poland, 1673 (who upon renovation became a clerical congregation in 1909).

Since the close of the 17th century, no new orders have been added to the number, though the name "clerics regular" has been assumed occasionally by communities that are technically only religious, or pious, congregations, such as the Clerks Regular of Our Saviour (1851–1919) and the Society of the Pallium (1851).

== See also ==
- Regular clergy
