= Gerolamo Emiliani =

Italian Catholic saint

Saint Jerome Emiliani CRS
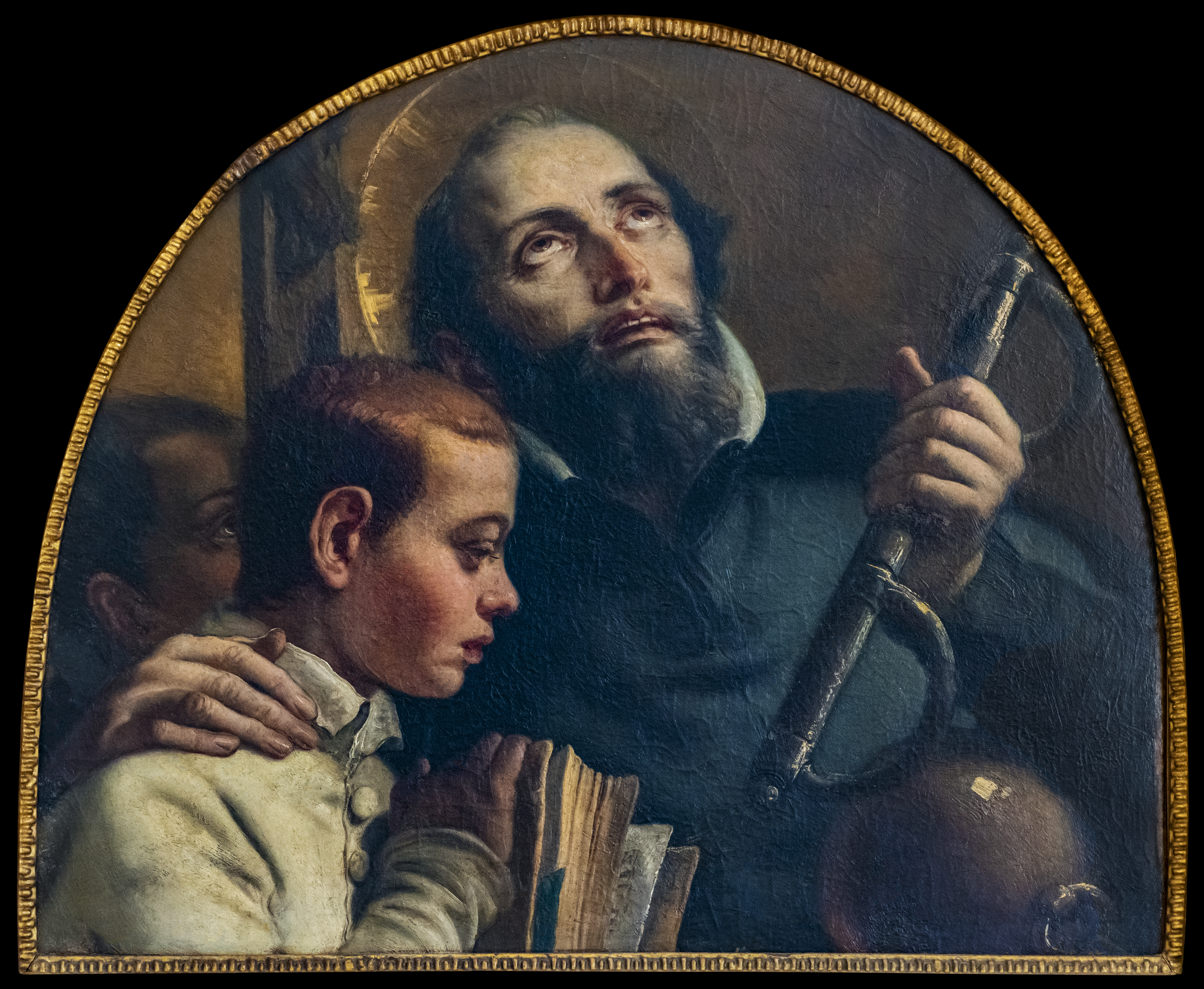
- Saint Gerolamo Emiliani by Giandomenico Tiepolo

Confessor
- Born: 1486; Venice
- Died: 8 February 1537 (aged 50–51); Somasca
- Venerated in: Catholic Church
- Beatified: 23 April 1747 by Pope Benedict XIV
- Canonized: 16 July 1767 by Pope Clement XIII
- Major shrine: St. Girolamo Emiliani Sanctuary, Somasca
- Feast: 8 February; 20 July (General Roman Calendar, 1769–1969)
- Patronage: orphans and abandoned children

Gerolamo Emiliani, CRS (Italian: Gerolamo Emiliani also Jerome Aemilian, Hiëronymus Emiliani) (1486 – 8 February 1537) was an Italian humanitarian, founder of the Somaschi Fathers, and is considered a saint by the Catholic Church.

Born in Venice, he spent some time in the military, and later served as a magistrate. Emiliani provided for the sick, the hungry, and orphans; and persuaded others to do likewise. Through his good offices a number of hospitals and orphanages were established in several northern Italian towns. He was canonized in 1767 and is the patron saint of orphans.

== Biography ==
Jerome was born in Venice, the son of Angelo Emiliani (popularly called Miani) and Eleonore Mauroceni. His father died when he was a teenager and Jerome ran away at the age of 15 to join the army. In 1508, he participated in the defense of Castelnuovo against the League of Cambray (this was two years before Pope Julius II joined the Venetians). He was appointed governor of a fortress in the mountains of Treviso, and while defending his post he was taken prisoner. Prior, he had not cared about God, but attributed his escape to the intercession of the Mother of God; and he made a pilgrimage to the shrine of Our Lady of Treviso, in fulfillment of a vow, and left his chains as an offering.

He was then appointed podestà (Venetian magistrate) of Castelnuovo di Quero, but after a short time returned to Venice to supervise the education of his nephews. All his spare time was devoted to the study of theology and to works of charity. In the year of plague and famine (1528), he seemed to be everywhere and showed his zeal, especially for the orphans, whose number had so greatly increased. Jerome began caring for the sick and feeding the hungry at his own expense. He rented a house for them near the church of St. Rose and, with the assistance of some pious laymen, ministered to their needs. To his charge was also committed the hospital for incurables, founded by Gaetano dei Conti di Thiene. In 1531 he went to Verona and induced the citizens to build a hospital; in Brescia, Bergamo, Milan and other places in northern Italy, he erected orphanages, for boys and for girls. At Bergamo, he also founded a hostel for repentant prostitutes. Blessed Pope John Paul II described him as a "lay animator of the laity."

Note that some sources, such as recent versions of Butler's Lives of the Saints, state clearly that he was ordained to the priesthood, other sources, such as the Martyrologium Romanum, do not say that he was a priest.

== Congregation of Regular Clerics ==
Two priests, Alessandro Besuzio and Agostino Bariso, then joined him in his labors of charity, and in 1532 Gerolamo founded a religious society, the Congregation of Regular Clerics. The motherhouse was at Somasca, a secluded northern Italian hamlet in the comune of Vercurago between Milan and Bergamo, after which the members became known as Somaschi. In the rule of this congregation, Gerolamo stated the principal work of the community was the care of orphans, poor and sick, and demanded that dwellings, food and clothing would bear the mark of religious poverty. Devoted to the guardian angels, Emiliani entrusted the congregation to the protection of the Virgin, the Holy Spirit and the Archangel Raphael.

The congregation was approved in 1540 by Pope Paul III with the official name "Clerici Regulares S. Majoli Papiae Congregationis Somaschae", and spread throughout Italy.

During an epidemic, Jerome was assisting the sick when he contracted the plague. He died in Somasca, 8 February 1537.

== Veneration ==
He was beatified by Pope Benedict XIV in 1747, and canonized by Pope Clement XIII on 16 July 1767. The Office and Mass in his honor were approved eight years later. He was thus not included in the 1570 Tridentine calendar. When inserted in the Roman calendar in 1769, he was assigned the date of 20 July. In 1969, Pope Paul VI moved his feast to the day of his death, 8 February.

The St. Gerolamo Emiliani Sanctuary is located in Somasca, Vercurago where a seventeenth century silver shrine contains his remains.

=== Patronage ===
In 1928, Pope Pius XI named him the patron of orphans and abandoned children.

== See also ==
- Martinitt, Milan orphanage founded by Emiliani
- Saint Gerolamo Emiliani, patron saint archive
