= Somasca =

Lombardi hamlet in northern Italy

Coordinates: 45°048′042″N 9°025′046″E

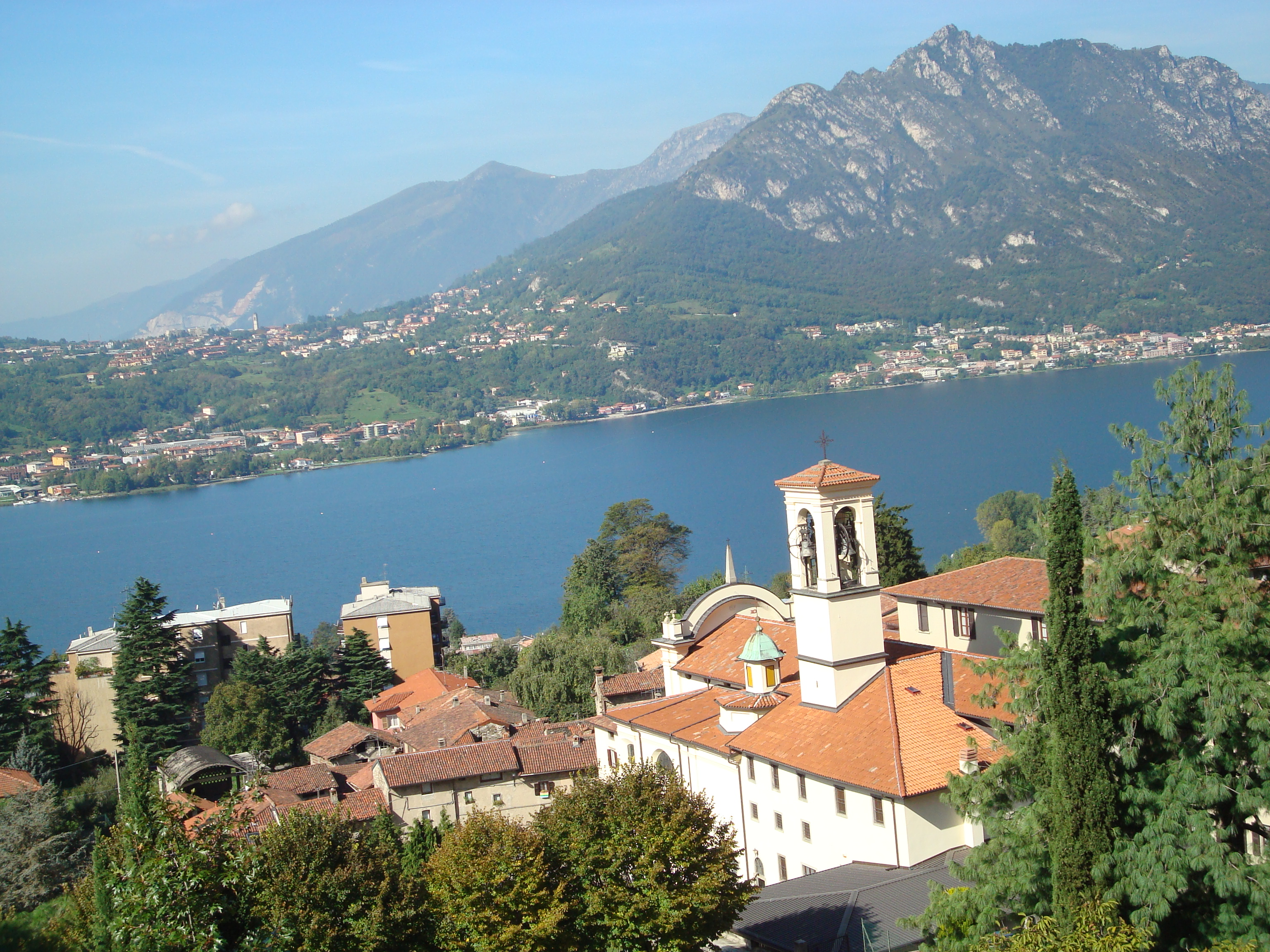
The Sanctuary of Somasca, which honours the memory of Saint Gerolamo Emiliani, overlooks Lake Como.

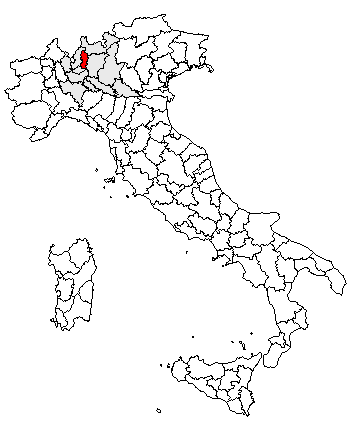
Location of the province of Lecco

Somasca is a hamlet in the northern Italian region of Lombardy, situated in the hills overlooking the south-eastern branch of Lake Como. For purposes of local government it counts as a frazione of the Commune of Vercurago, which falls within the Province of Lecco.

== History ==
Somasca is known chiefly for having given its name to the Somaschi Fathers, an order of priests devoted to charitable works which was founded by Saint Gerolamo Emiliani in 1532.
