= Dreyfus affair =

1894–1906 political scandal in France

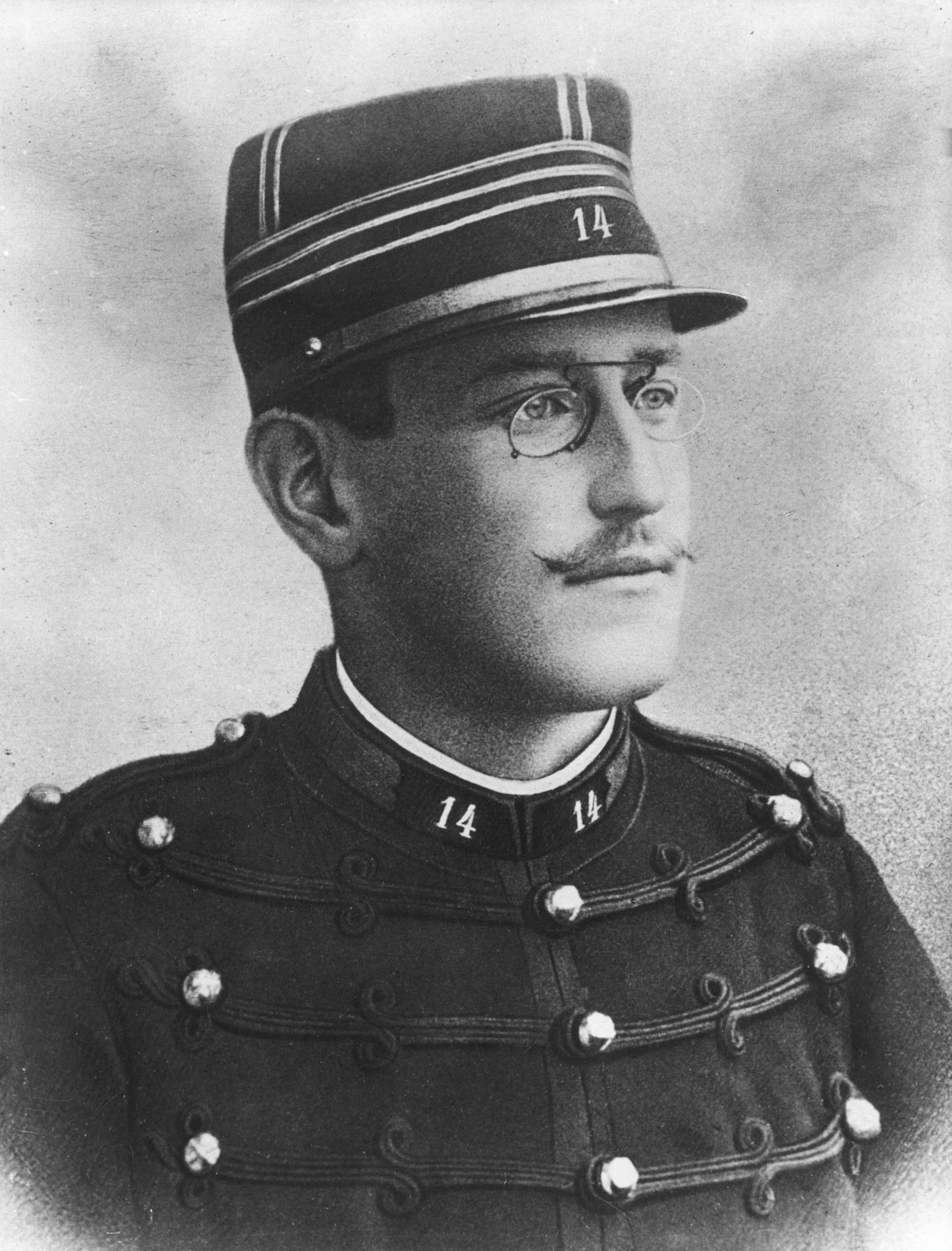
Dreyfus in 1894, the year he was prosecuted

The Dreyfus affair (French: affaire Dreyfus, pronounced [afɛːʁ dʁɛfys]) was a political scandal that divided the Third French Republic from 1894 until its resolution in 1906. The scandal began in December 1894 when Captain Alfred Dreyfus, a 35-year-old Alsatian French artillery officer of Jewish descent, was wrongfully convicted of treason for communicating French military secrets to the German Embassy in Paris. He was sentenced to life imprisonment and sent overseas to the penal colony on Devil's Island in French Guiana, where he spent the following five years imprisoned in very harsh conditions.

In 1896, evidence came to light—primarily through the investigations of Lieutenant Colonel Georges Picquart, head of counter-espionage—that identified the real culprit as a French Army major named Ferdinand Walsin Esterhazy. High-ranking military officials suppressed the new evidence, and a military court unanimously acquitted Esterhazy after a trial lasting two days. The Army laid additional charges against Dreyfus, based on forged documents. Subsequently, writer Émile Zola's open letter "J'Accuse...!" in the newspaper L'Aurore stoked a growing movement of political support for Dreyfus, putting pressure on the government to reopen the case.

In 1899, Dreyfus was returned to France for another trial. The intense political and judicial scandal that ensued divided French society between those who supported Dreyfus, the "Dreyfusards" such as Sarah Bernhardt, Anatole France, Charles Péguy, Henri Poincaré, Georges Méliès, and Georges Clemenceau; and those who condemned him, the "anti-Dreyfusards" such as Édouard Drumont, the director and publisher of the antisemitic newspaper La Libre Parole. The new trial resulted in another conviction and a 10-year sentence, but Dreyfus was pardoned and released. In 1906, Dreyfus was exonerated. After being reinstated as a major in the French Army, he served during the whole of World War I, ending his service with the rank of lieutenant colonel. He died in 1935.

The Dreyfus affair came to symbolise modern injustice in the Francophone world; it remains one of the most notable examples of a miscarriage of justice and of antisemitism. The affair divided France into pro-republican, anticlerical Dreyfusards and pro-army, mostly Catholic anti-Dreyfusards, embittering French politics and encouraging radicalisation. The press played a crucial role in exposing information and in shaping and expressing public opinion on both sides of the conflict.

== Contexts ==
=== Political ===
In 1894, the Third Republic was twenty-four years old. Although the 16 May Crisis in 1877 had crippled the political influence of both the Bourbon and Orléanist royalists, its ministries continued to be short-lived as the country lurched from crisis to crisis: three years immediately preceding the Dreyfus affair were the near-coup of Georges Boulanger in 1889, the Panama scandals in 1892, and the anarchist threat (reduced by the "villainous laws" of July 1894). The elections of 1893 were focused on the "social question" and resulted in a Republican victory (just under half the seats) against the conservative right, and the reinforcement of the Radicals (about 150 seats) and Socialists (about 50 seats).

The opposition of the Radicals and Socialists resulted in a centrist government with policies oriented towards economic protectionism, a certain indifference to social issues, a willingness to break international isolation, the Russian alliance, and the development of the colonial empire. These centrist policies resulted in cabinet instability, with some Republican members of the government sometimes aligning with the radicals and some Orléanists aligning with the Legitimists in five successive governments from 1893 to 1896. This instability coincided with an equally unstable presidency: President Sadi Carnot was assassinated on 24 June 1894; his moderate successor Jean Casimir-Perier resigned several months later on 15 January 1895 and was replaced by Félix Faure.

Following the failure of the radical government of Léon Bourgeois in 1896, the president appointed Jules Méline as prime minister. His government faced the opposition of the left and of some Republicans (including the Progressive Union) and made sure to keep the support of the right. He sought to appease religious, social, and economic tensions and conducted a fairly conservative policy. He succeeded in improving stability, and it was under this stable government that the Dreyfus affair occurred.

=== Military ===
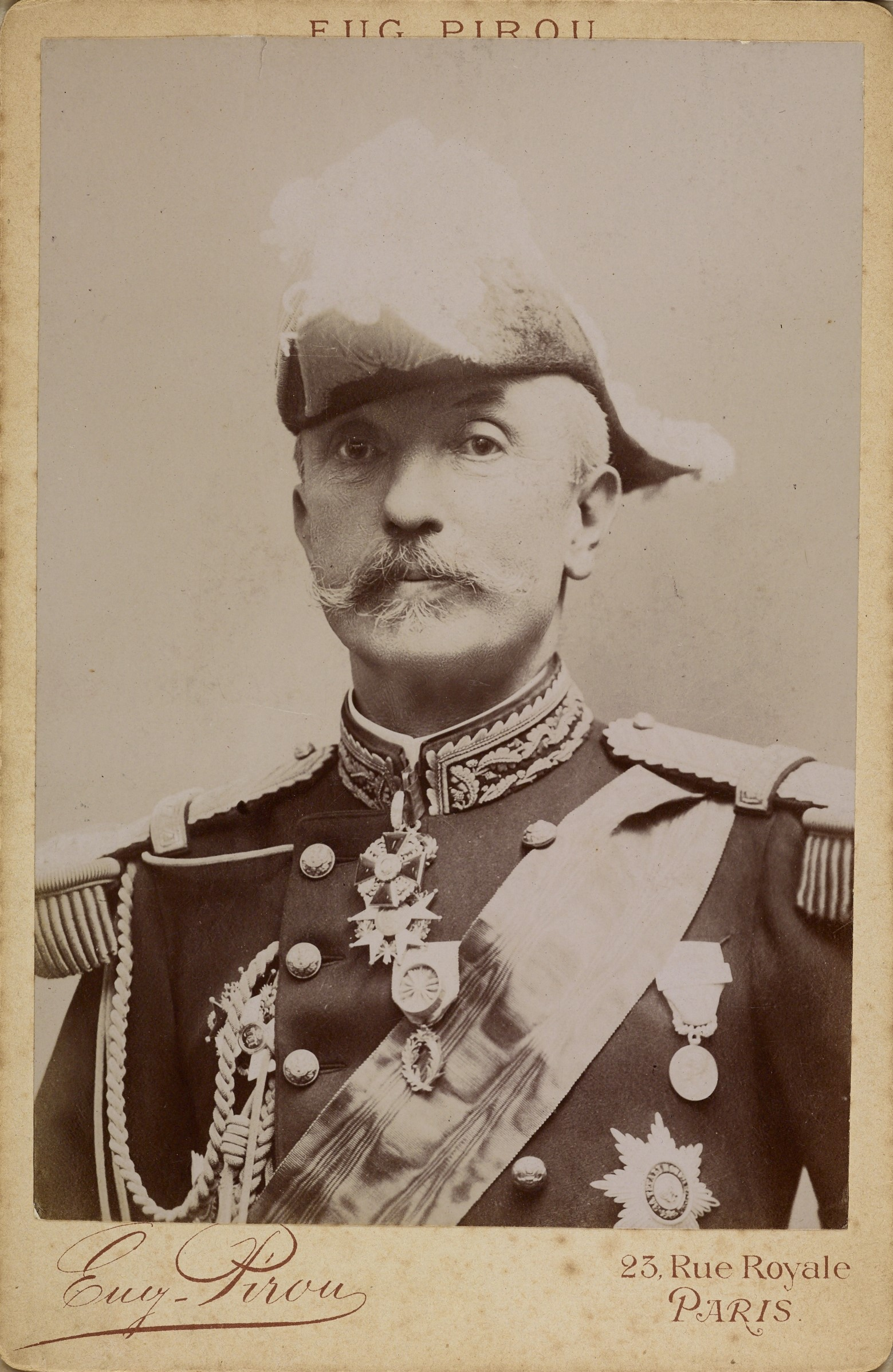
General Raoul Le Mouton de Boisdeffre, architect of the military alliance with Russia

The Dreyfus affair occurred in the context of German annexation of Alsace and Moselle, an event that fed the most extreme nationalism. The traumatic defeat of France in 1870 seemed far away, but a vengeful spirit remained.

The military required considerable resources to prepare for the next conflict, and it was in this spirit that the Franco-Russian Alliance of 27 August 1892 was signed, although some opponents thought it "against nature". (Note: Auguste Scheurer-Kestner in a speech in the Senate.) The army had recovered from the defeat, but many of its officers were aristocrats and monarchists. Cult of the flag and contempt for the parliamentary republic prevailed in the army. The Republic celebrated its army; the army ignored the Republic.

Over the previous ten years, the army had undergone a significant shift resulting from its twofold aim to democratize and modernize. The graduates of the École Polytechnique now competed effectively with officers from the main career path of Saint-Cyr, which caused strife, bitterness, and jealousy among junior officers expecting promotions. The period was also marked by an arms race that primarily affected artillery. There were improvements in heavy artillery (guns of 120 mm and 155 mm, Models 1890 Baquet, new hydropneumatic brakes), but also, and especially, development of the ultra-secret 75mm gun.

The operation of military counterintelligence, alias the "Statistics Section" (SR), should be noted. Spying as a tool for secret war was a novelty as an organised activity by governments in the late 19th century. The Statistics Section was created in 1871 but consisted of only a handful of officers and civilians. Its head in 1894 was Lieutenant-Colonel Jean Sandherr, a graduate of Saint-Cyr, an Alsatian from Mulhouse, and a convinced antisemite. Its military mission was clear: to retrieve information about potential enemies of France and to feed them false information. The Statistics Section was supported by the "Secret Affairs" of the Quai d'Orsay at the Ministry of Foreign Affairs, which was headed by a young diplomat, Maurice Paléologue.

The arms race created an acute atmosphere of intrigue from 1890 in French counter-espionage. One of the missions of the section was to spy on the German Embassy at Rue de Lille in Paris to thwart any attempt by the French to transmit important information to the Germans. This was especially critical since several cases of espionage had already been featured in the headlines of newspapers, which were fond of sensationalism. In 1890, the archivist Boutonnet was convicted for selling plans of shells that used melinite.

The German military attaché in Paris in 1894 was Count Maximilian von Schwartzkoppen, who developed a policy of infiltration that appears to have been effective. In the 1880s, Schwartzkoppen had begun an affair with an Italian military attaché, Lieutenant Colonel Count Alessandro Panizzardi. While neither had anything to do with Dreyfus, their intimate and erotic correspondence (e.g., "Don't exhaust yourself with too much buggery."), which was obtained by the authorities, lent an air of truth to other documents that were forged by prosecutors to lend retroactive credibility to Dreyfus's conviction as a spy. Some of these forgeries referred to the real affair between the two officers; in one, Alessandro supposedly informed his lover that if "Dreyfus is brought in for questioning", they must both claim that they "never had any dealings with that Jew. ... Clearly, no one can ever know what happened with him."

The letters, real and fake, provided a convenient excuse for placing the entire Dreyfus dossier under seal, given that exposure of the liaison would have 'dishonoured' Germany and Italy's military and compromised diplomatic relations. As homosexuality was, like Judaism, then often perceived as a sign of national degeneration, recent historians have suggested that combining them to inflate the scandal may have shaped the prosecution strategy.

Since early 1894, the Statistics Section had investigated traffic in master plans for Nice and the Meuse conducted by an officer whom the Germans and Italians nicknamed Dubois. This is what led to the origins of the Dreyfus affair.

=== Social ===
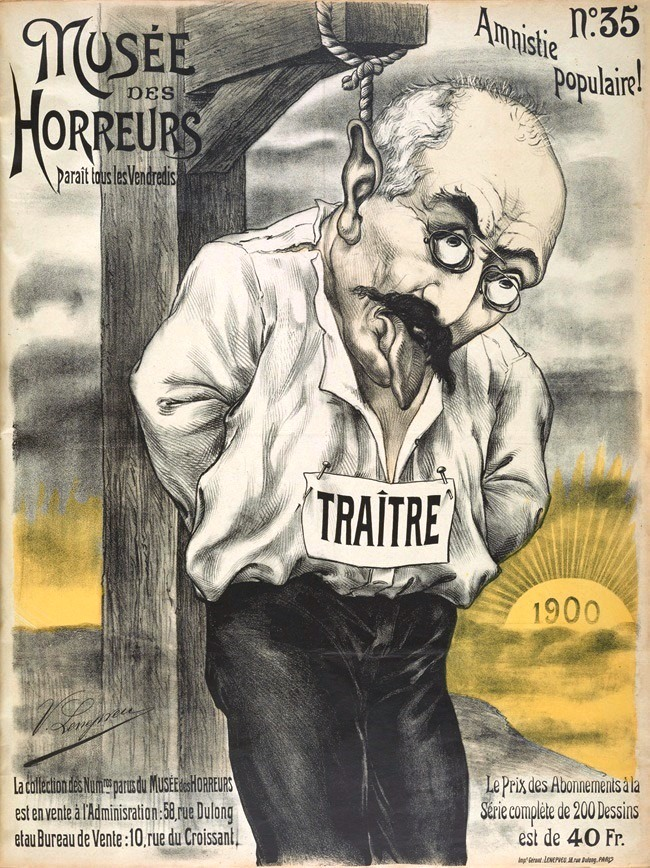
No. 35 Amnistie populaire of the Musée des Horreurs depicts the hanged corpse of an antisemitic caricature of Alfred Dreyfus.

The social context was marked by the rise of nationalism and antisemitism. The growth of antisemitism, virulent since the publication of Jewish France by Édouard Drumont in 1886 (150,000 copies in the first year), went hand in hand with the rise of clericalism. Tensions were high in all strata of society, fueled by an influential press, which was virtually free to write and disseminate any information even if offensive or defamatory. Legal risks were limited if the target was a private person.

Antisemitism did not spare the military, which practised hidden discrimination with the "cote d'amour" (a subjective assessment of personal acceptability) system of irrational grading, encountered by Dreyfus in his application to the Bourges School. However, while prejudices of this nature undoubtedly existed within the confines of the General Staff, the French Army as a whole was relatively open to individual talent. At the time of the Dreyfus affair there were an estimated 300 Jewish officers in the army (about 3 per cent of the total), of whom ten were generals.

The popularity of the duel using sword or small pistol, sometimes causing death, bore witness to the tensions of the period. When a series of press articles in La Libre Parole accused Jewish officers of "betraying their birth", the officers challenged the editors. Captain Crémieu-Foa, a Jewish Alsatian graduated from the Ecole Polytechnique, fought unsuccessfully against Drumont and against M. de Lamase, who was the author of the articles. Captain Mayer, another Jewish officer, was killed by the Marquis de Morès, a friend of Drumont, in another duel.

Hatred of Jews was now public and violent, driven by a firebrand (Drumont) who demonized the Jewish presence in France. Jews in metropolitan France in 1895 numbered about 80,000 (40,000 in Paris alone), who were highly integrated into society; an additional 45,000 Jews lived in Algeria. The launch of La Libre Parole with a circulation estimated at 200,000 copies in 1892, allowed Drumont to expand his audience to a popular readership already enticed by the boulangiste adventure in the past. The antisemitism circulated by La Libre Parole, as well as by L'Éclair, Le Petit Journal, La Patrie, L'Intransigeant and La Croix, drew on antisemitic roots in certain Catholic circles.

Publications remarking on the Dreyfus affair often reinforced antisemitic sentiments, language and imagery. The Musée des Horreurs was a collection of anti-Dreyfus posters illustrated by Victor Lenepveu during the Dreyfus affair. Lenepveu caricatured "prominent Jews, Dreyfus supporters, and Republican statesman". No. 35 Amnistie populaire depicts the corpse of Dreyfus himself as it dangles from a noose. Large noses, money, and Lenepveu's general tendency to illustrate subjects with bodies of animals likely contributed to the dissemination of antisemitism in French popular culture.

== Origins of the case and the trial of 1894 ==
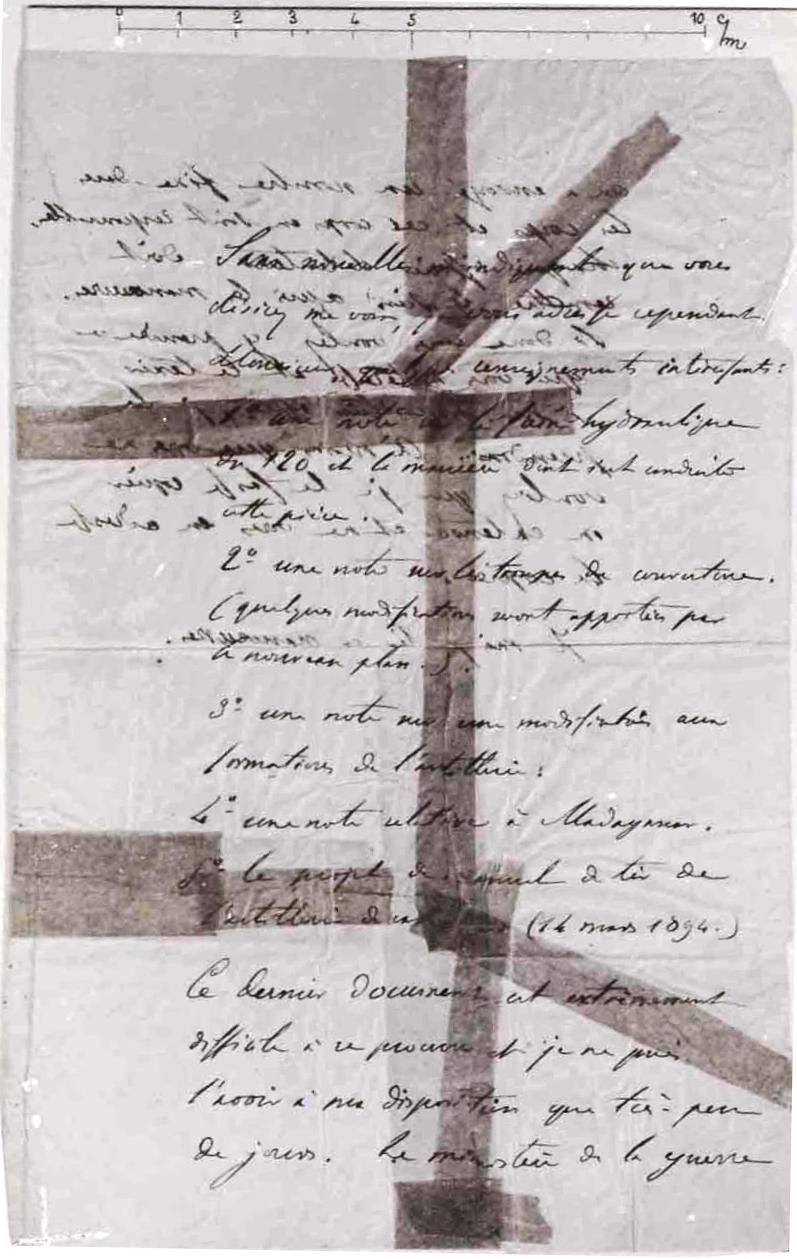
Photograph of the bordereau dated 13 October 1894. The original disappeared in 1940.

=== Discovery of the "bordereau" ===
The staff of the Military Intelligence Service (SR) worked around the clock to spy on the German Embassy in Paris. They had managed to get a French housekeeper named "Madame Bastian" hired to work in the building and spy on the Germans. In September 1894, she found a torn-up note which she handed over to her employers at the Military Intelligence Service. This note later became known as "the bordereau". (Note: The French word bordereau [bɔʁ.də.ʁo] means simply a note or slip of paper and can be applied to any note. In French, many documents in the case were called bordereaux; however, in this translation the term bordereau is used only for this note.) This piece of paper, torn into six large pieces, unsigned and undated, was addressed to the German military attaché stationed at the German Embassy, Maximilian von Schwartzkoppen. It stated that confidential French military documents regarding the newly developed "hydraulic brake of 120, and the way this gun has worked" were about to be sent to a foreign power.

=== The search for the author of the bordereau ===
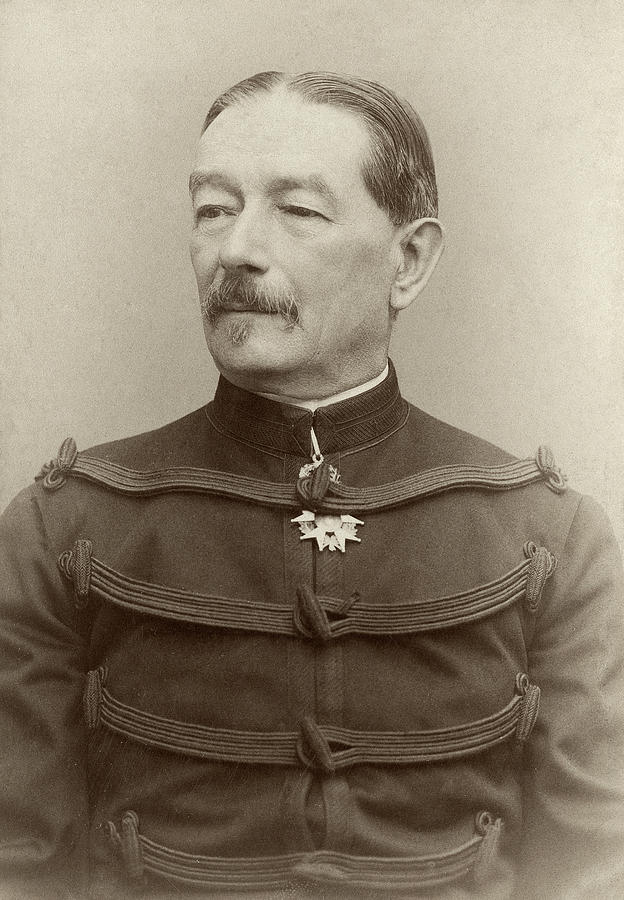
General Auguste Mercier, Minister of War in 1894

This catch seemed of sufficient importance for the head of the "Statistical Section", the Mulhousian Jean Sandherr, to inform the Minister of War, General Auguste Mercier. In fact the SR suspected that there had been leaks since the beginning of 1894 and had been trying to find the perpetrator. The minister had been harshly attacked in the press for his actions, which were deemed incompetent, and appears to have sought an opportunity to enhance his image. He immediately initiated two secret investigations, one administrative and one judicial. To find the culprit, using simple though crude reasoning, the circle of the search was arbitrarily restricted to suspects posted to, or former employees of, the General Staff – necessarily a trainee artillery (Note: On the indication of Captain Matton, the only artillery officer in the Statistics Section. Three of the documents transmitted concerned short- and long-range artillery.) officer. (Note: The documents could come from 1st, 2nd, 3rd or 4th offices – only a trainee appeared able to offer such a variety of documents as they passed from one office to another to complete their training. This was the reasoning of Lieutenant-Colonel d'Aboville, which proved fallacious.)

The ideal culprit was identified: Captain Alfred Dreyfus, a graduate of the École polytechnique and an artillery officer, of the Jewish faith and of Alsatian origin, coming from the republican meritocracy. At the beginning of the case, the emphasis was rather on the Alsatian origins of Dreyfus than on his religion. These origins were not, however, exceptional because these officers were favoured by France for their knowledge of the German language and culture. There was also antisemitism in the offices of the General Staff, and it fast became central to the affair by filling in the credibility gaps in the preliminary enquiry. In particular, Dreyfus was at that time the only Jewish officer to be recently passed by the General Staff.

In fact, the reputation of Dreyfus as a cold and withdrawn or even haughty character, as well as his "curiosity", worked strongly against him. These traits of character, some false, others natural, made the charges plausible by turning the most ordinary acts of everyday life in the ministry into proof of espionage. From the beginning a biased and one-sided multiplication of errors led the State to a false position. This was present throughout the affair, where irrationality prevailed over the positivism in vogue in that period:

From this first hour the phenomenon occurred that will dominate the whole affair. It is no longer controlled by facts and circumstances carefully examined which will constitute a belief; it is the irresistible cavalier conviction which distorts the facts and beliefs.

— Joseph Reinach

=== Expertise in writing ===
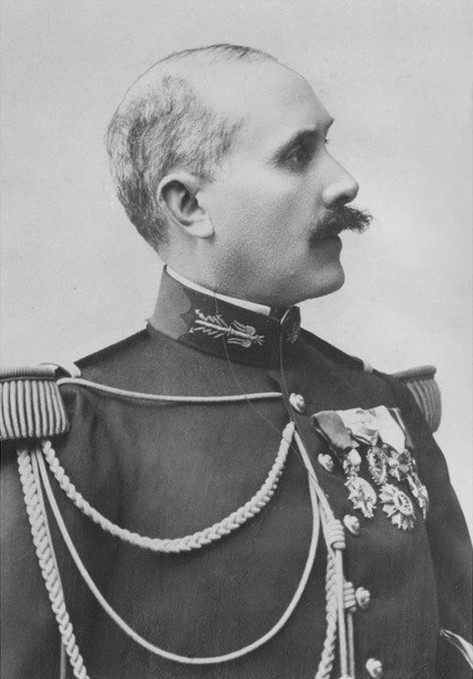
Major du Paty de Clam, head of investigation, arrested Captain Dreyfus.

To condemn Dreyfus, the writing on the bordereau had to be compared to that of the Captain. There was nobody competent to analyse the writing on the General Staff. Then Major du Paty de Clam entered the scene: an eccentric man who prided himself on being an expert in graphology. On being shown some letters by Dreyfus and the bordereau on 5 October, du Paty concluded immediately who had written the two writings. After a day of additional work he provided a report that, despite some differences, the similarities were sufficient to warrant an investigation. Dreyfus was therefore "the probable author" of the bordereau in the eyes of the General Staff.

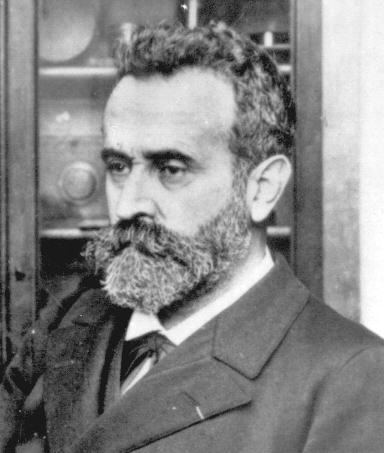
Alphonse Bertillon was not a handwriting expert, but he invented the theory of "autoforgery".

General Mercier believed he had the guilty party, but he exaggerated the value of the affair, which took on the status of an affair of state during the week preceding the arrest of Dreyfus. The Minister did consult and inform all the authorities of the State, yet despite prudent counsel and courageous objections expressed by Gabriel Hanotaux in the Council of Ministers he decided to pursue it. Du Paty de Clam was appointed Judicial Police Officer to lead an official investigation.

Meanwhile, several parallel sources of information were opening up, some on the personality of Dreyfus, others to ensure the truth of the identity of the author of the bordereau. The expert (Note: Expert in writing from the Bank of France: his honest caution was vilified in the indictment of Major Ormescheville.) Gobert was not convinced and found many differences. He even wrote that "the nature of the writing on the bordereau excludes disguised handwriting". Disappointed, Mercier then called in Alphonse Bertillon, the inventor of forensic anthropometry but no handwriting expert. He was initially no more positive than Gobert but he did not exclude the possibility of its being the writing of Dreyfus. Later, under pressure from the military, he argued that Dreyfus had autocopied it and developed his theory of "autoforgery".

=== The arrest ===
On 13 October 1894, without any tangible evidence and with an empty file, General Mercier summoned Captain Dreyfus for a general inspection in "bourgeois clothing", i.e. in civilian clothes. The purpose of the General Staff was to obtain the perfect proof under French law: a confession. That confession was to be obtained by surprise – by dictating a letter based on the bordereau to reveal his guilt.

On the morning of 15 October 1894, Captain Dreyfus underwent this ordeal but admitted nothing. Du Paty even tried to suggest suicide by placing a revolver in front of Dreyfus, but he refused to take his life, saying he "wanted to live to establish his innocence". The hopes of the military were crushed. Nevertheless Du Paty de Clam still arrested the captain, accused him of conspiring with the enemy, and told him that he would be brought before a court-martial. Dreyfus was imprisoned at the Cherche-Midi prison in Paris.

=== The enquiry and the first military court ===
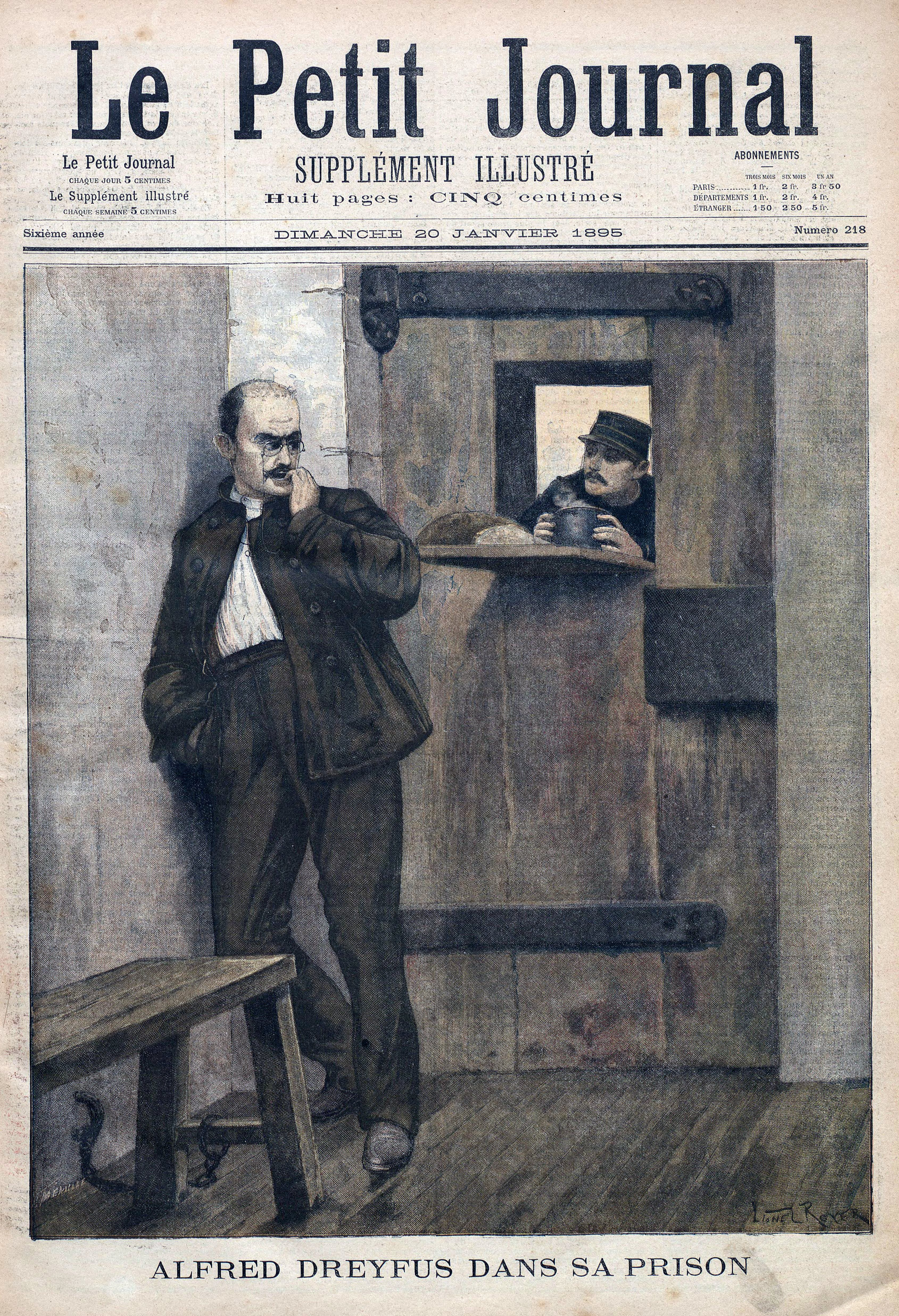
Cover of Le Petit Journal, 20 January 1895 (illustration by Fortuné Méaulle after Lionel Royer)

Mrs. Dreyfus was informed of the arrest the same day by a police raid to search their apartment. She was terrorized by Du Paty, who ordered her to keep the arrest of her husband secret and even said, "One word, one single word and it will be a European war!" Illegally, Dreyfus was placed in solitary confinement in prison, where Du Paty interrogated him day and night trying to obtain a confession, which failed. The captain was morally supported by the first Dreyfusard, Major Forzinetti, commandant of the military prisons of Paris.

On 29 October 1894, the affair was revealed in an article in La Libre Parole, the antisemitic newspaper owned by Édouard Drumont. This marked the beginning of a very brutal press campaign until the trial. This event put the affair in the field of antisemitism, where it remained until its conclusion.

On 1 November 1894, Alfred's brother, Mathieu Dreyfus, became aware of the arrest after being called urgently to Paris. He became the architect of the arduous fight for the liberation of his brother. Without hesitation, he began looking for a lawyer, and retained the distinguished criminal lawyer Edgar Demange.

=== The enquiry ===
On 3 November 1894, General Saussier, the military governor of Paris, reluctantly gave the order for an enquiry. He had the power to stop the process but did not, perhaps because of an exaggerated confidence in military justice. Major Besson d'Ormescheville, the recorder for the Military Court, wrote an indictment in which "moral elements" of the charge (which gossiped about the habits of Dreyfus and his alleged attendance at "gambling circles", his knowledge of German, and his "remarkable memory") were developed more extensively than the "material elements", (Note: These are treated in the single penultimate paragraph in one sentence: "The material elements consist of the incriminating letter including review by the majority of experts as well as by us and by the witnesses who have seen it until now except for those who wilfully see differences, showing a complete similarity with the authentic writing of Captain Dreyfus".) which are rarely seen in the charge:

"This is a proof of guilt because Dreyfus made everything disappear".

The complete lack of neutrality of the indictment led to Émile Zola calling it a "monument of bias".

After the news broke on Dreyfus's arrest, many journalists flocked to the story and flooded the story with speculations and accusations. The renowned journalist and antisemitic agitator Edouard Drumont wrote in his publication on 3 November 1894, "What a terrible lesson, this disgraceful treason of the Jew Dreyfus."

On 4 December 1894, Dreyfus was referred to the first Military Court with this dossier. The secrecy was lifted and Demange could access the file for the first time. After reading it the lawyer had absolute confidence, as he saw the emptiness of the prosecution's case. The prosecution rested completely on the writing on a single piece of paper, the bordereau, on which experts disagreed, and on vague indirect testimonies.

=== The trial: "Closed Court or War!" ===
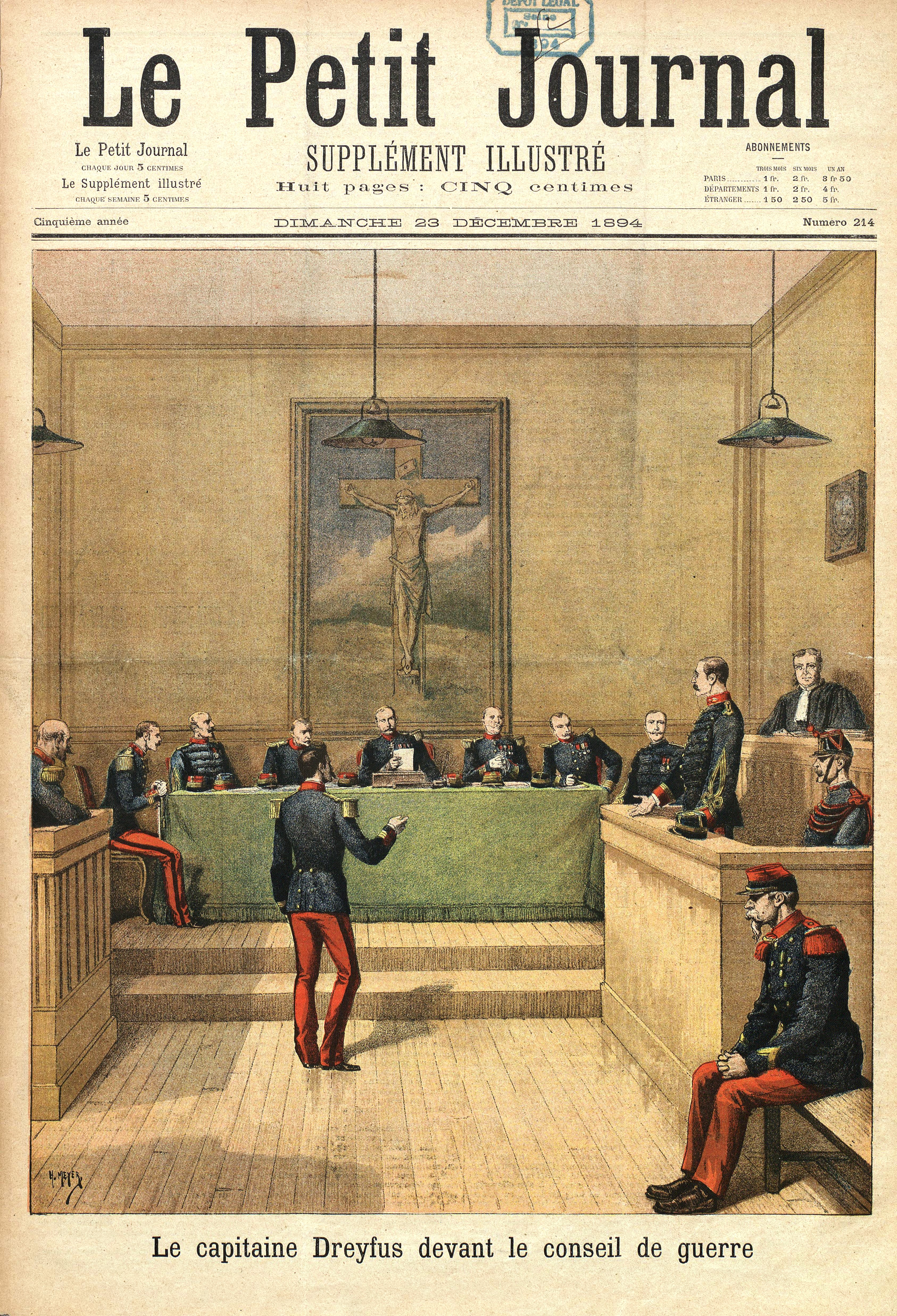
From Le Petit Journal (23 December 1894)

During the two months before the trial, the press went wild. La Libre Parole, L'Autorité, Le Journal, and Le Temps described the supposed life of Dreyfus through lies and bad fiction. This was also an opportunity for extreme headlines from La Libre Parole and La Croix to justify their previous campaigns against the presence of Jews in the army on the theme "You have been told!" This long delay above all enabled the General Staff to prepare public opinion and to put indirect pressure on the judges. On 8 November 1894, General Mercier declared Dreyfus guilty in an interview with Le Figaro. He repeated himself on 29 November 1894 in an article by Arthur Meyer in Le Gaulois, which in fact condemned the indictment against Dreyfus and asked, "How much freedom will the military court have to judge the defendant?"

The jousting of the columnists took place within a broader debate about the issue of a closed court. For Ranc and Cassagnac, who represented the majority of the press, the closed court was a low manoeuvre to enable the acquittal of Dreyfus, "because the minister is a coward". The proof was "that he grovels before the Prussians" by agreeing to publish the denials of the German ambassador in Paris. In other newspapers, such as L'Éclair on 13 December 1894: "the closed court is necessary to avoid a casus belli"; while for Judet in Le Petit Journal of 18 December: "the closed court is our impregnable refuge against Germany"; or in La Croix the same day: it must be "the most absolute closed court".

The trial opened on 19 December 1894 at one o'clock and a closed court was immediately pronounced. This closed court was not legally consistent since Major Picquart and Prefect Louis Lépine were present at certain proceedings in violation of the law. The closed court allowed the military to avoid disclosing the emptiness of their evidence to the public and to stifle debate. As expected, the emptiness of their case appeared clearly during the hearings. Detailed discussions on the bordereau showed that Captain Dreyfus could not be the author. At the same time the accused himself protested his innocence and defended himself point by point with energy and logic. Moreover, his statements were supported by a dozen defense witnesses. Finally, the absence of motive for the crime was a serious thorn in the prosecution case. Dreyfus was indeed a very patriotic officer highly rated by his superiors, very rich and with no tangible reason to betray France. The fact of Dreyfus's Jewishness, which was used extensively by the right-wing press, was not openly presented in court.

Alphonse Bertillon, an eccentric criminologist who was not an expert in handwriting, was presented as a scholar of the first importance. He advanced the theory of "autoforgery" during the trial and accused Dreyfus of imitating his own handwriting, explaining the differences in writing by using extracts of writing from his brother Matthieu and his wife Lucie. This theory, although later regarded as bizarre and astonishing, seems to have had some effect on the judges. In addition, Major Hubert-Joseph Henry, deputy head of the SR and discoverer of the bordereau, made a theatrical statement in open court. He argued that leaks betraying the General Staff had been suspected to exist since February 1894 and that "a respectable person" accused Captain Dreyfus. He swore on oath that the traitor was Dreyfus, pointing to the crucifix hanging on the wall of the court. Dreyfus was apoplectic with rage and demanded to be confronted with his anonymous accuser, which was rejected by the General Staff. The incident had an undeniable effect on the court, which was composed of seven officers who were both judges and jury. However, the outcome of the trial remained uncertain. The conviction of the judges had been shaken by the firm and logical answers of the accused. The judges took leave to deliberate, but the General Staff still had a card in hand to tip the balance decisively against Dreyfus.

=== Transmission of a secret dossier to the judges ===
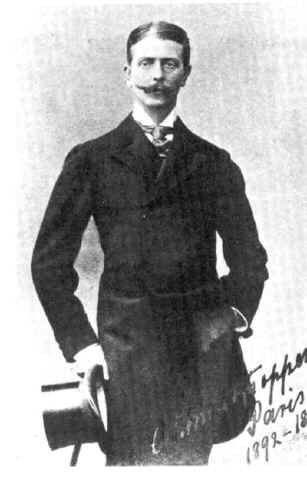
Max von Schwartzkoppen always claimed never to have known Dreyfus.

Military witnesses at the trial alerted high command about the risk of acquittal. For this eventuality the Statistics Section had prepared a file containing, in principle, four "absolute" proofs of the guilt of Captain Dreyfus accompanied by an explanatory note. The contents of this secret file remained uncertain until 2013, when they were released by the French Ministry of Defence. Recent research indicates the existence of numbering which suggests the presence of a dozen documents. Among these letters were some of an erotic homosexual nature (the Davignon letter among others) raising the question of the tainted methods of the Statistics Section and the objective of their choice of documents.

The secret file was illegally submitted at the beginning of the deliberations by the President of the Military Court, Colonel Émilien Maurel, by order of the Minister of War, General Mercier. Later at the Rennes trial of 1899, General Mercier explained (falsely) the nature of the prohibited disclosure of the documents submitted in the courtroom. This file contained, in addition to letters without much interest, some of which were falsified, a piece known as the "Scoundrel D ...".

It was a letter from the German military attaché, Maximilian von Schwartzkoppen, to the Italian military attaché, Lieutenant Colonel Alessandro Panizzardi, intercepted by the SR. The letter was supposed to accuse Dreyfus definitively since, according to his accusers, it was signed with the initial of his name. In reality, the Statistics Section knew that the letter could not be attributed to Dreyfus and if it was, it was with criminal intent. Colonel Maurel confirmed in the second Dreyfus trial that the secret documents were not used to win the support of the judges of the Military Court. He contradicted himself, however, by saying that he read only one document, "which was enough".

=== Conviction, degradation, and deportation ===
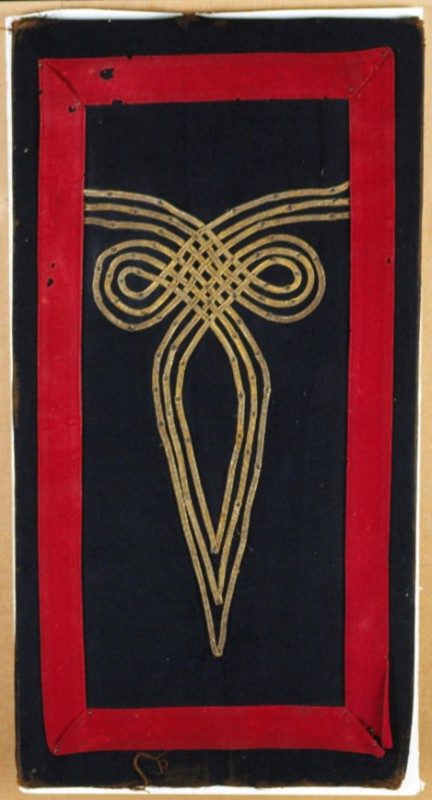
Dreyfus's Austrian knot, torn off as a symbol of treason – Museum of Jewish Art and History

On 22 December 1894, after several hours of deliberation, the verdict was reached. Seven judges unanimously convicted Alfred Dreyfus of collusion with a foreign power, to the maximum penalty under section 76 of the Criminal Code: permanent exile in a walled fortification (prison), the cancellation of his army rank and military degradation, also known as cashiering. Dreyfus was not sentenced to death, as it had been abolished for political crimes since 1848.

For the authorities, the press and the public, doubts had been dispelled by the trial and his guilt was certain. Right and left regretted the abolition of the death penalty for such a crime. Antisemitism peaked in the press and occurred in areas so far spared. Socialist leader Jean Jaurès regretted the lightness of the sentence in an address to the Chamber of Deputies and wrote, "A soldier has been sentenced to death and executed for throwing a button in the face of his corporal. So why leave this miserable traitor alive?" Radical Republican Georges Clemenceau in La Justice made a similar comment.

On 5 January 1895, the ceremony of degradation took place in the Morlan Court of the Military School in Paris. While the drums rolled, Dreyfus was accompanied by four artillery officers, who brought him before an officer of the state who read the judgment. A Republican Guard adjutant tore off his badges, thin strips of gold, his stripes, cuffs and sleeves of his jacket. As he was paraded throughout the streets, the crowd chanted "Death to Judas, death to the Jew." Witnesses report the dignity of Dreyfus, who continued to maintain his innocence while raising his arms: "Innocent, Innocent! Long live France! Long live the army". The Adjutant broke his sword on his knee and then the condemned Dreyfus marched at a slow pace in front of his former companions. An event known as "the legend of the confession" took place before the degradation. In the van that brought him to the military school, Dreyfus is said to have confided his treachery to Captain Lebrun-Renault. It appears that this was merely self-promotion by the captain of the Republican Guard, and that in reality Dreyfus had made no admission. Due to the affair's being related to national security, the prisoner was then held in solitary confinement in a cell awaiting transfer. On 17 January 1895, he was transferred to the prison on Île de Ré where he was held for over a month. He had the right to see his wife twice a week in a long room, each of them at one end, with the director of the prison in the middle.

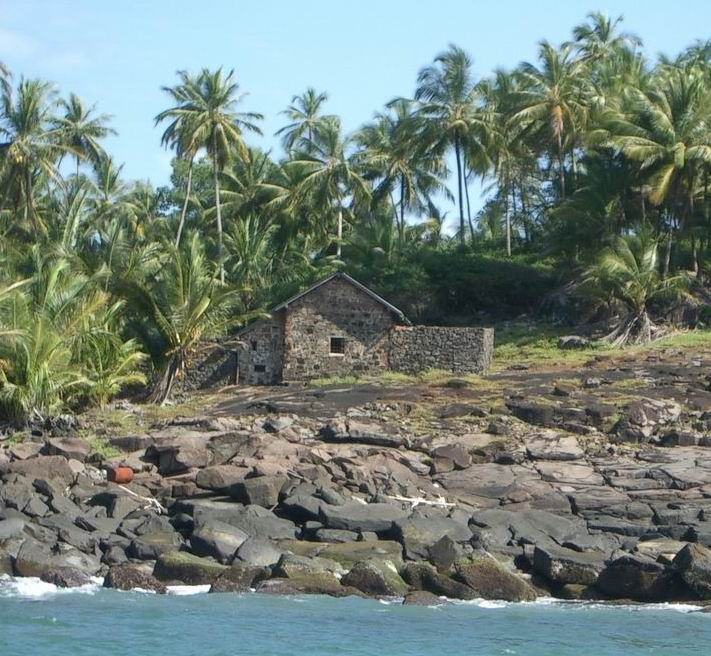
Dreyfus's Hut on Devil's Island in French Guiana

At the last minute, on 9 February 1895, at the initiative of General Mercier, a law was passed restoring the Îles du Salut in French Guiana as a place of fortified deportation, so that Dreyfus was not sent to Ducos, New Caledonia. Indeed, during the deportation of Adjutant Lucien Châtelain, sentenced for conspiring with the enemy in 1888, the facilities did not provide the required conditions of confinement and detention conditions were considered too soft. On 21 February 1895, Dreyfus embarked on the ship Ville de Saint-Nazaire. The next day the ship sailed for French Guiana.

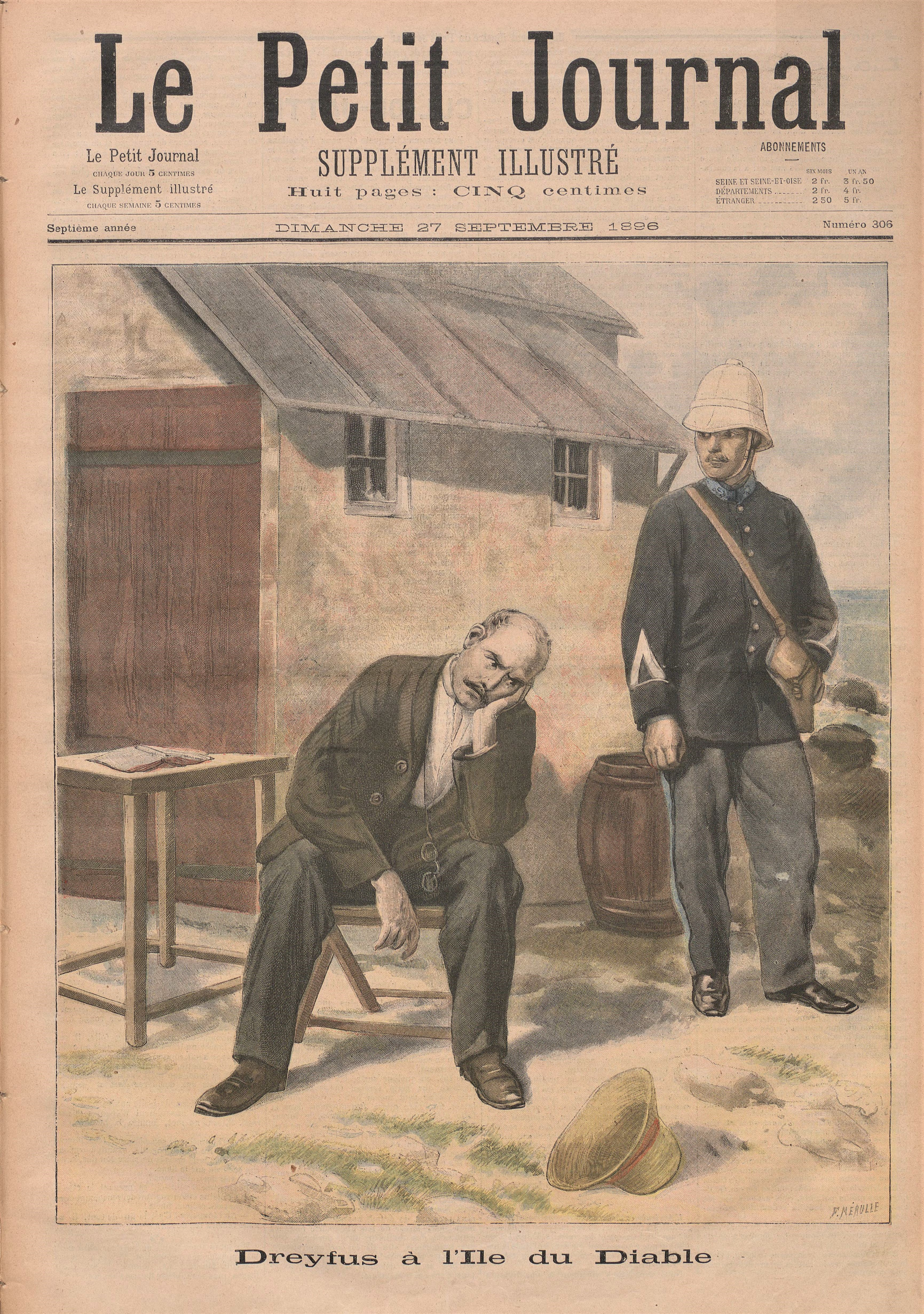
Le Petit Journal (27 September 1896)

On 12 March 1895, after a difficult voyage of fifteen days, the ship anchored off the Îles du Salut. Dreyfus stayed one month in prison on Île Royale and was transferred to Devil's Island on 14 April 1895. Apart from his guards, he was the only inhabitant of the island and he stayed in a stone hut 4 by 4 metres (13 ft × 13 ft). Haunted by the risk of escape, the commandant of the prison sentenced him to a hellish life, even though living conditions were already very painful. The temperature reached 45 °C, he was underfed or fed contaminated food and hardly had any treatment for his many tropical diseases. Dreyfus became sick and shaken by fevers that got worse every year.

Dreyfus was allowed to write on paper numbered and signed. He underwent censorship by the commandant even when he received mail from his wife Lucie, whereby they encouraged each other. On 6 September 1896, the conditions of life for Dreyfus worsened again; he was chained double looped, forcing him to stay in bed motionless with his ankles shackled. This measure was the result of false information of his escape revealed by a British newspaper. For two long months, Dreyfus was plunged into deep despair, convinced that his life would end on this remote island.

== The truth emerges (1895–1897) ==
=== The Dreyfus family exposes the affair and takes action ===
Mathieu Dreyfus, the elder brother of Alfred, was convinced of his innocence. He was the chief architect of the rehabilitation of his brother and spent his time, energy and fortune to gather an increasingly powerful movement for a retrial in December 1894, despite the difficulties of the task:

After the degradation emptiness was around us. It seemed to us that we were no longer human beings like others, we were cut off from the world of the living.

Mathieu tried all paths, even the most fantastic. Thanks to Dr. Gibert, a friend of President Félix Faure, he met at Le Havre a woman who spoke for the first time under hypnosis of a "secret file". This fact was confirmed by the President of the Republic to Dr. Gibert in a private conversation.

Little by little, despite threats of arrest for complicity, machinations and entrapment by the military, he managed to convince various moderates. Thus the anarchist journalist Bernard Lazare looked into the proceedings. In 1896, Lazare published the first Dreyfusard booklet in Brussels. This publication had little influence on the political and intellectual world, but it contained so much detail that the General Staff suspected that Picquart, the new head of SR, was responsible.

The campaign for the review, relayed little by little into the leftist anti-military press, triggered a return of a violent yet vague antisemitism. France was overwhelmingly anti-Dreyfusard; Major Henry from the Statistics Section, in turn, was aware of the thinness of the prosecution case. At the request of his superiors, General Boisdeffre, Chief of the General Staff and Major-General Gonse, he was charged with the task of enlarging the file to prevent any attempt at a review. Unable to find any evidence, he decided to build some after the fact.

=== The discovery of the real culprit: Picquart "going to the enemy" ===
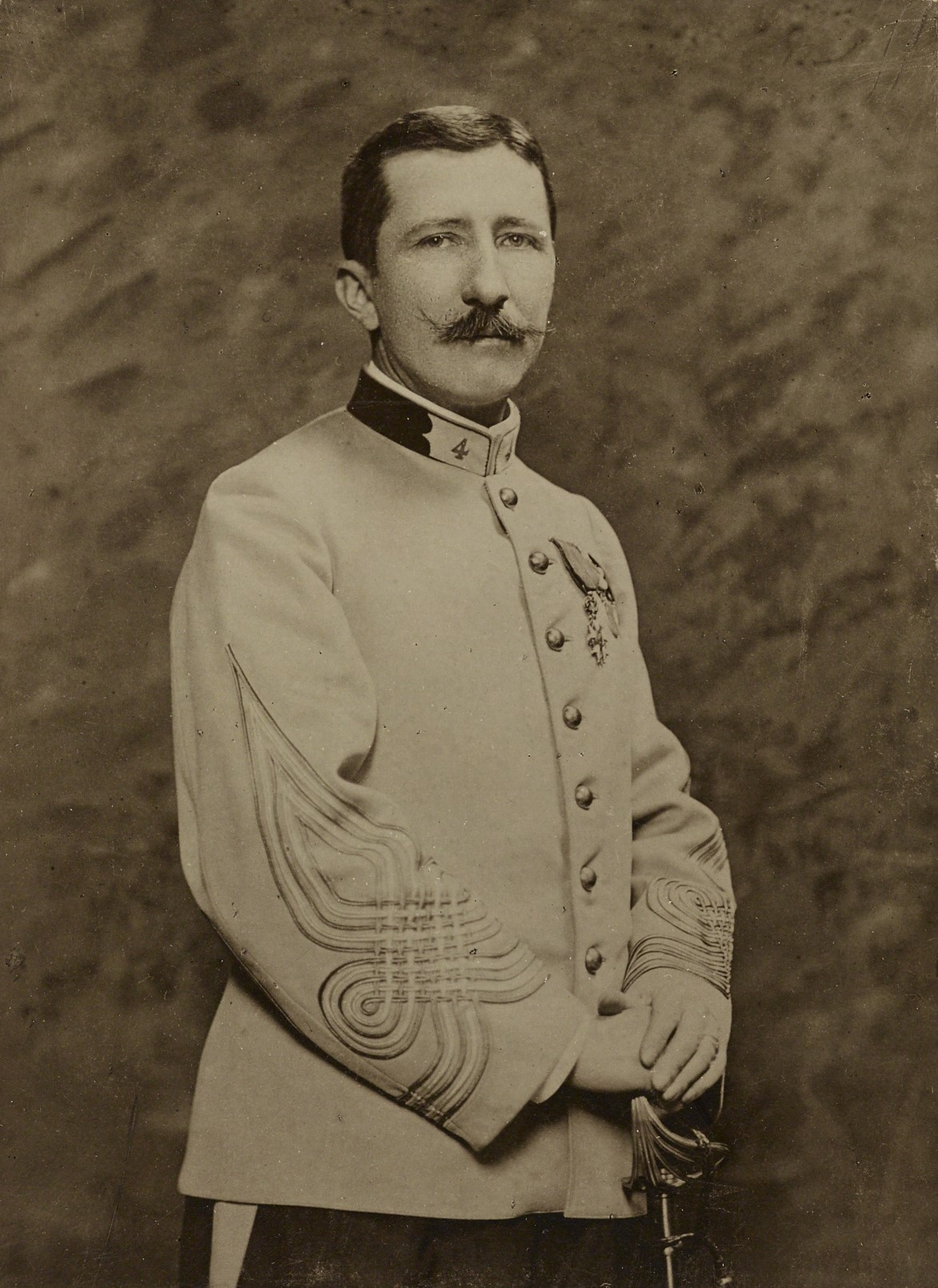
Lieutenant Colonel Georges Picquart in the uniform of the 4th Algerian Tirailleurs

Major Georges Picquart was assigned to be head of the staff of the Military Intelligence Service (SR) in July 1895, following the illness of Colonel Sandherr. In March 1896, Picquart, who had followed the Dreyfus affair from the outset, now required to receive the documents stolen from the German Embassy directly without any intermediary. He discovered a document called the "petit bleu": a telegram that was never sent, written by von Schwarzkoppen and intercepted at the German Embassy at the beginning of March 1896. It was addressed to a French officer, Major Walsin-Esterhazy, 27 rue de la Bienfaisance – Paris. In another letter in black pencil, von Schwarzkoppen revealed the same clandestine relationship with Esterhazy.

On seeing letters from Esterhazy, Picquart realized with amazement that his writing was exactly the same as that on the "bordereau", which had been used to incriminate Dreyfus. He procured the "secret file" given to the judges in 1894 and was astonished by the lack of evidence against Dreyfus, and became convinced of his innocence. Moved by his discovery, Picquart diligently conducted an enquiry in secret without the consent of his superiors. The enquiry demonstrated that Esterhazy had knowledge of the elements described by the "bordereau" and that he was in contact with the German Embassy. It was established that the officer sold the Germans many secret documents, whose value was quite low.

Ferdinand Walsin Esterhazy was a former member of French counterespionage, where he had served after the war of 1870. He had worked in the same office as Major Henry from 1877 to 1880. A man with a personality disorder, a sulphurous reputation and crippled by debt, he was considered by Picquart to be a traitor driven by monetary reasons to betray his country. Picquart communicated the results of his investigation to the General Staff, which opposed him under "the authority of the principle of res judicata". After this, everything was done to oust him from his position, with the help of his own deputy, Major Henry. It was primarily the upper echelons of the Army that did not want to admit that Dreyfus's conviction could be a grave miscarriage of justice. For Mercier, then Zurlinden and the General Staff, what was done was done and should never be returned to. They found it convenient to separate the Dreyfus and Esterhazy affairs.

=== The denunciation of Esterhazy and the progress of Dreyfusism ===
The nationalist press launched a violent campaign against the burgeoning Dreyfusards. In counterattack, the General Staff discovered and revealed the information hitherto ignored in the "secret file". Doubt began to surface, and figures in the artistic and political spheres asked questions. (Note: Cassagnac, though antisemitic, published an article entitled Doubt (in French) in mid-September 1896.) Picquart tried to convince his seniors to react in favour of Dreyfus, but the General Staff seemed deaf. An investigation was started against him, he was monitored when he was in the east, and he was then transferred to Tunisia "in the interest of the service".

At this moment Major Henry took action. On 1 November 1896, he created a false document, subsequently called the "faux Henry" [Henry forgery], (Note: Otherwise known as "faux patriotique" [patriotic forgery] by the anti-Dreyfusards.) keeping the header and signature of an ordinary letter from Panizzardi, and wrote the central text himself:

I read that a deputy will call on Dreyfus. If you ask further explanations from Rome, I would say that I never had relations with the Jew. That is understood. If asked, speak like that, because that person should never know what happened with him.

This was a crude forgery. Generals Gonse and Boisdeffre, however, without asking questions, brought the letter to their minister, General Jean-Baptiste Billot. The doubts of the General Staff regarding the innocence of Dreyfus flew out the window. With this discovery the General Staff decided to protect Esterhazy and persecute Colonel Picquart, "who did not understand anything". Picquart, who knew nothing of the "faux Henry", quickly felt isolated from his fellow soldiers. Major Henry accused Picquart of embezzlement and sent him a letter full of innuendo. He protested in writing and returned to Paris.

Picquart confided in his friend, lawyer Louis Leblois, who promised secrecy. Leblois, however, spoke to the vice president of the Senate, the Alsatian Auguste Scheurer-Kestner (born in Mulhouse, like Dreyfus), who was in turn infected by doubts. Without citing Picquart, the senator revealed the affair to the highest people in the country. The General Staff, however, still suspected Picquart of causing leaks. This was the beginning of the Picquart affair, a new conspiracy by the General Staff against an officer.

Major Henry, although deputy to Picquart, was jealous and fostered his own malicious operation to compromise his superior. He engaged in various malpractices, including making a letter and designating it as an instrument of a "Jewish syndicate", wanting to help Dreyfus to escape, rigging the "petit bleu" to create a belief that Picquart erased the name of the real recipient, and drafting a letter naming Dreyfus in full.

Parallel to the investigations of Picquart, the defenders of Dreyfus were informed in November 1897 that the identity of the writer of the "bordereau" was Esterhazy. Mathieu Dreyfus had a reproduction of the bordereau published by Le Figaro. A banker, Castro, formally identified the writing as that of Esterhazy, who was his debtor, and told Mathieu. On 11 November 1897, the two paths of investigation met during a meeting between Scheurer-Kestner and Mathieu Dreyfus. The latter finally received confirmation that Esterhazy was the author of the note. Based on this, on 15 November 1897 Mathieu Dreyfus made a complaint to the minister of war against Esterhazy. The controversy was now public and the army had no choice but to open an investigation. At the end of 1897, Picquart returned to Paris and made public his doubts about the guilt of Dreyfus because of his discoveries. Collusion to eliminate Picquart seemed to have failed. The challenge was very strong and turned to confrontation. To discredit Picquart, Esterhazy sent, without effect, letters of complaint to the president of the republic.

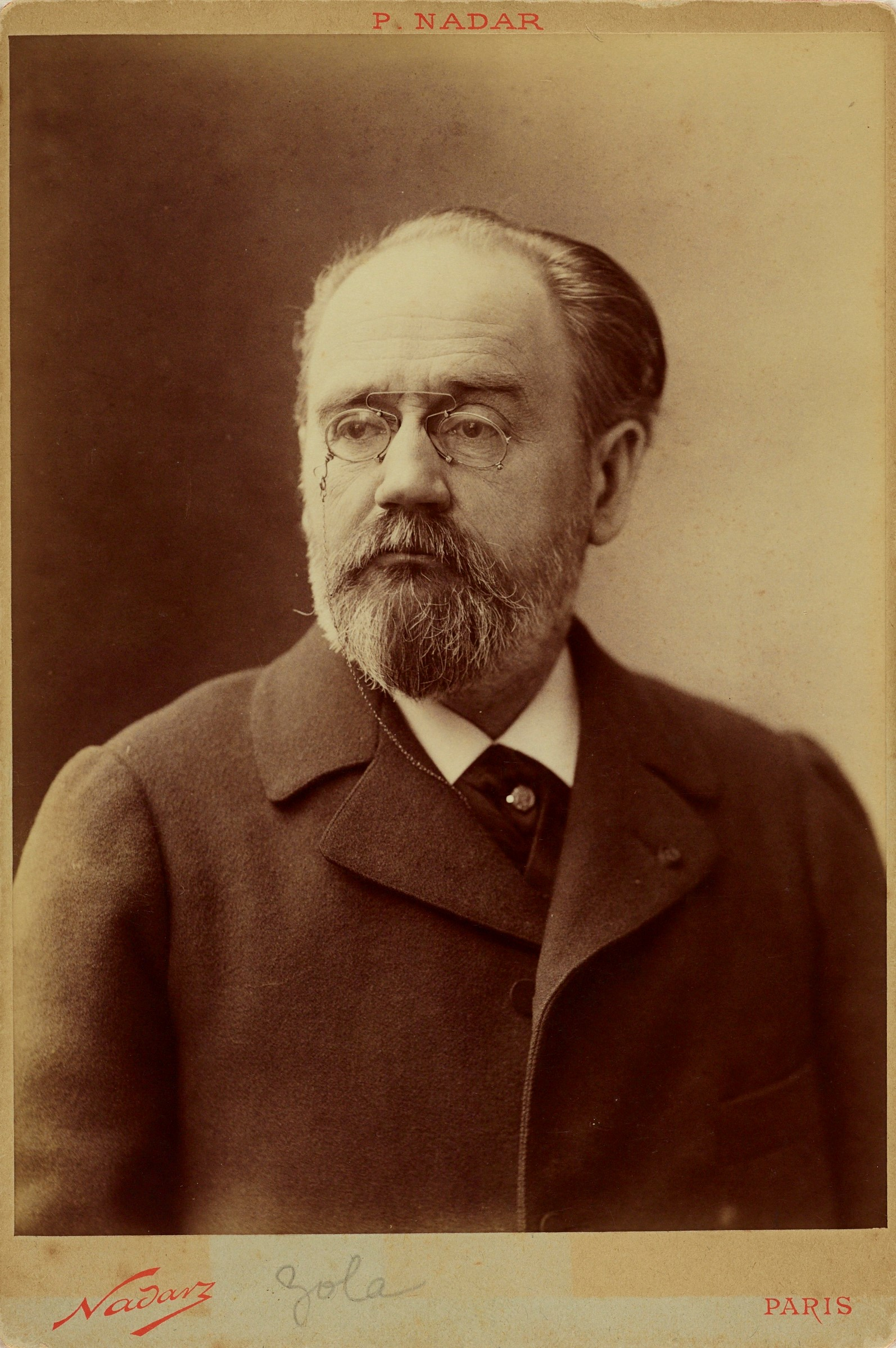
Émile Zola in 1898

The Dreyfusard movement, led by Bernard Lazare, Mathieu Dreyfus, Joseph Reinach and Auguste Scheurer-Kestner gained momentum. Émile Zola, informed in mid-November 1897 by Scheurer-Kestner with documents, was convinced of the innocence of Dreyfus and undertook to engage himself officially. (Note: "He had already intervened in Le Figaro in May 1896, in the article "For the Jews".) On 25 November 1897 the novelist published Mr. Scheurer-Kestner in Le Figaro, which was the first article in a series of three. (Note: According to the Syndicat of 1 December 1897 and the Minutes of 5 December 1897.) Faced with threats of massive cancellations from its readers, the paper's editor stopped supporting Zola. Gradually, from late-November through early-December 1897, a number of prominent people got involved in the fight for retrial. These included the authors Octave Mirbeau (his first article was published three days after Zola) and Anatole France, academic Lucien Lévy-Bruhl, the librarian of the École normale supérieure Lucien Herr (who convinced Léon Blum and Jean Jaurès), the authors of La Revue Blanche, (Note: At that time the heart of the artistic avant-garde, publishing Marcel Proust, Saint-Pol-Roux, Jules Renard, Charles Péguy, et al.) (where Lazare knew the director Thadee Natanson), and the Clemenceau brothers Albert and Georges. Blum tried in late November 1897 to sign, with his friend Maurice Barrès, a petition calling for a retrial, but Barrès refused, broke with Zola and Blum in early December, and began to popularize the pejorative use of the term "intellectuals". This first break was the prelude to a division among the educated elite after 13 January 1898.

The Dreyfus affair occupied more and more discussions, something the political world did not always recognize. Jules Méline declared in the opening session of the National Assembly on 7 December 1897, "There is no Dreyfus affair. There is not now and there can be no Dreyfus affair."

=== Trial and acquittal of Esterhazy ===
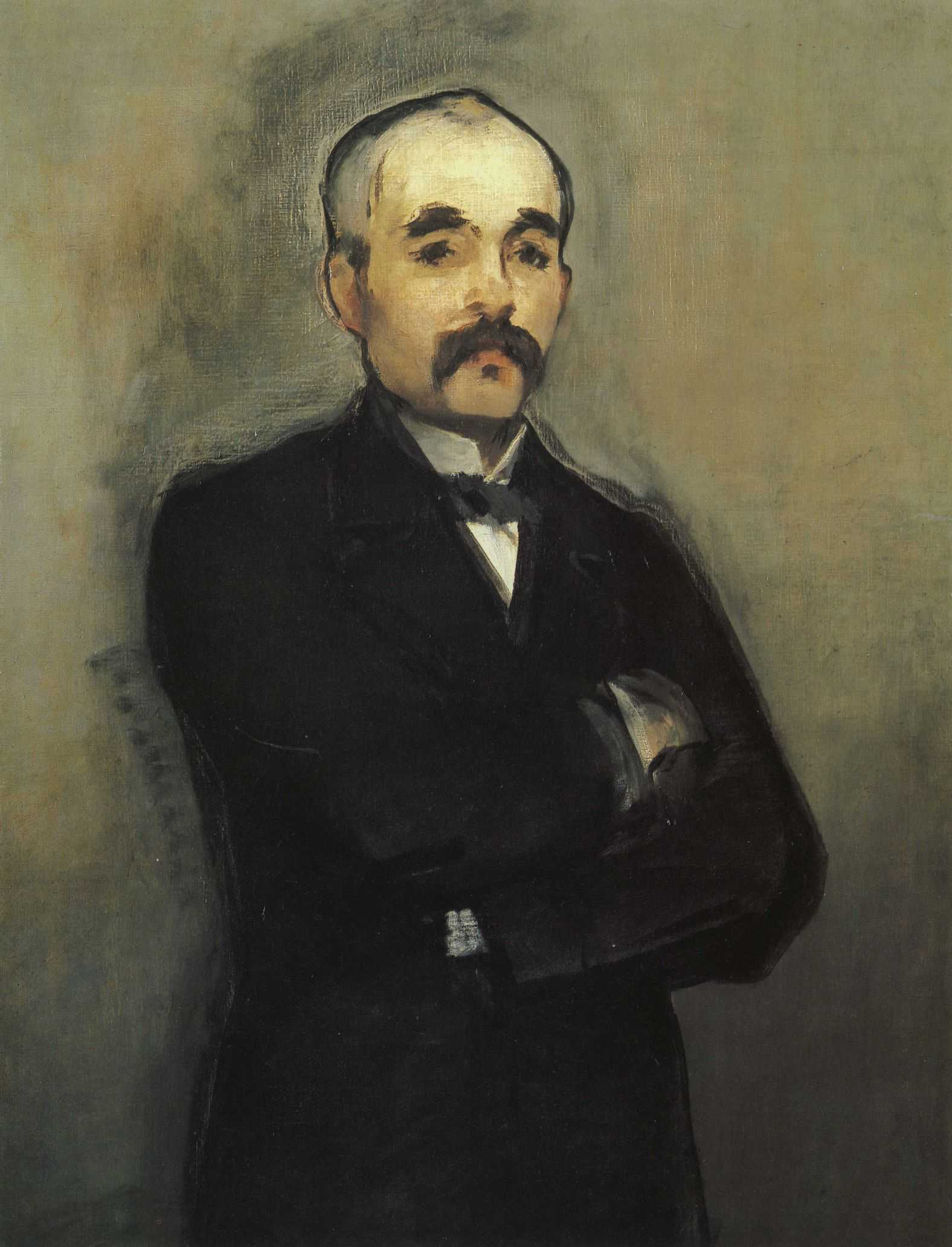
Portrait of Georges Clemenceau by the painter Édouard Manet

General Georges-Gabriel de Pellieux was responsible for conducting an investigation. It was brief, thanks to the General Staff's skillful manipulation of the investigator. The real culprit, they said, was Lieutenant-Colonel Picquart. The investigation was moving towards a predictable conclusion until Esterhazy's former mistress, Madame de Boulancy, published letters in Le Figaro in which ten years earlier Esterhazy had expressed violently his hatred for France and his contempt for the French army. The militarist press rushed to the rescue of Esterhazy with an unprecedented antisemitic campaign. The Dreyfusard press replied with strong new evidence in its possession. Georges Clemenceau, in the newspaper L'Aurore, asked, "Who protects Major Esterhazy? The law must stop sucking up to this ineffectual Prussian disguised as a French officer. Why? Who trembles before Esterhazy? What occult power, why shamefully oppose the action of justice? What stands in the way? Why is Esterhazy, a character of depravity and more than doubtful morals, protected while the accused is not? Why is an honest soldier such as Lieutenant-Colonel Picquart discredited, overwhelmed, dishonoured? If this is the case we must speak out!"

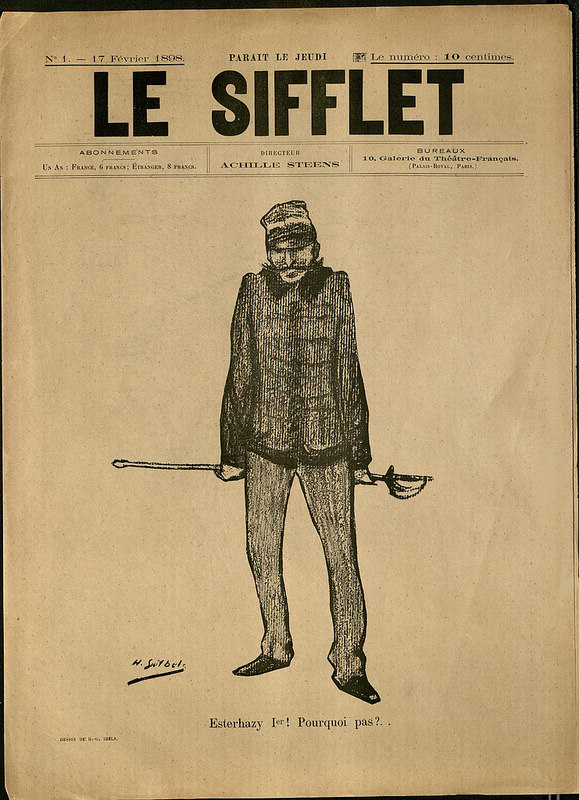
Newspaper showing Esterhazy

Although protected by the General Staff and therefore by the government, Esterhazy was obliged to admit authorship of the Francophobe letters published by Le Figaro. This convinced the Office of the General Staff to find a way to stop the questions, doubts, and the beginnings of demands for justice. The idea was to require Esterhazy to demand a trial and be acquitted, to stop the noise and allow a return to order. Thus, to finally exonerate him, according to the old rule Res judicata pro veritate habetur, (Note: "What is already judged is held to be true".) Esterhazy was set to appear before a military court on 10 January 1898. A "delayed" closed court (Note: The room is emptied as soon as discussion covers topics related to national defence, i.e., the testimony of Picquart.) trial was pronounced. Esterhazy was notified of the matter on the following day, along with guidance on the defensive line to take. The trial was not normal: the civil trial Mathieu and Lucy Dreyfus (Note: President Delegorgue refused to be questioned when he was called to the bar.) requested was denied, and the three handwriting experts decided the writing in the bordereau was not Esterhazy's. The accused was applauded and the witnesses booed and jeered. Pellieux intervened to defend the General Staff without legal substance. The real accused was Picquart, who was dishonoured by all the military protagonists of the affair. Esterhazy was acquitted unanimously the next day after just three minutes of deliberation. With all the cheering, it was difficult for Esterhazy to make his way toward the exit, where some 1,500 people were waiting.

By error an innocent person was convicted, but on order the guilty party was acquitted. For many moderate Republicans it was an intolerable infringement of the fundamental values they defended. The acquittal of Esterhazy therefore brought about a change of strategy for the Dreyfusards. Liberalism-friendly Scheurer-Kestner and Reinach, took more combative and rebellious action. In response to the acquittal, large and violent riots by anti-Dreyfusards and antisemites broke out across France.

Flush with victory, the General Staff arrested Picquart on charges of violation of professional secrecy following the disclosure of his investigation through his lawyer, who revealed it to Senator Scheurer-Kestner. The colonel, although placed under arrest at Fort Mont-Valérien, did not give up and involved himself further in the affair. When Mathieu thanked him, he replied curtly that he was "doing his duty". Esterhazy benefited from special treatment by the upper echelons of the army, which was inexplicable except for the General Staff's desire to stifle any inclination to challenge the verdict of the court martial that had convicted Dreyfus in 1894. The army declared Esterhazy unfit for service.

=== Esterhazy's flight to England and confession ===
To avoid personal risk Esterhazy shaved off his prominent moustache and went into exile in England.

Rachel Beer, editor of The Observer and the Sunday Times, interviewed him twice. He confessed to writing the bordereau under orders from Sandherr in an attempt to frame Dreyfus. She wrote about her interviews in September 1898, reporting his confession and writing a leader column accusing the French military of antisemitism and calling for a retrial for Dreyfus. Esterhazy lived comfortably in England until his death in 1923.

== J'Accuse ...! (1898) ==
=== The Dreyfus affair becomes "The Affair" ===
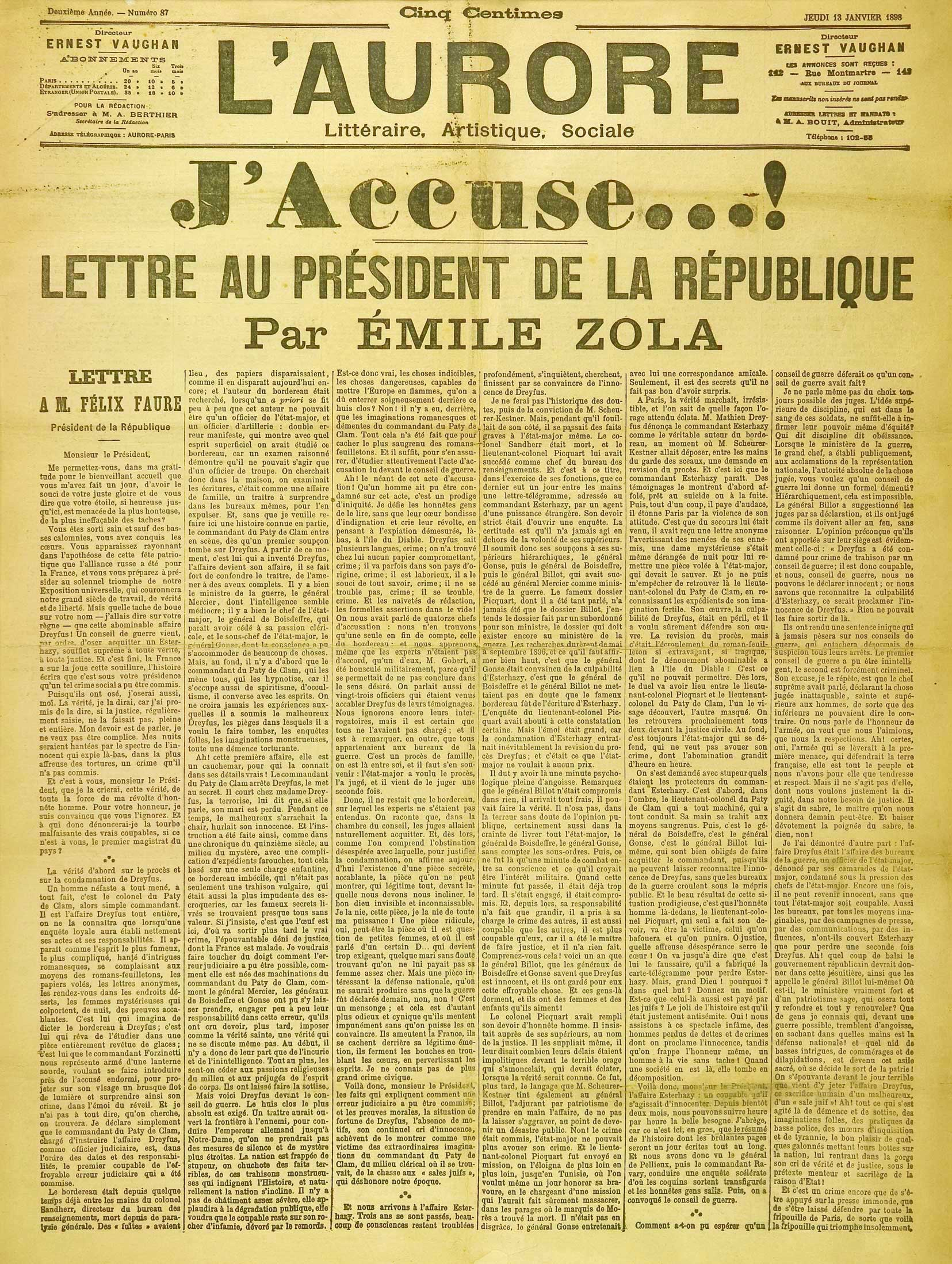
Page one of L'Aurore, J'Accuse...! by Émile Zola, 13 January 1898

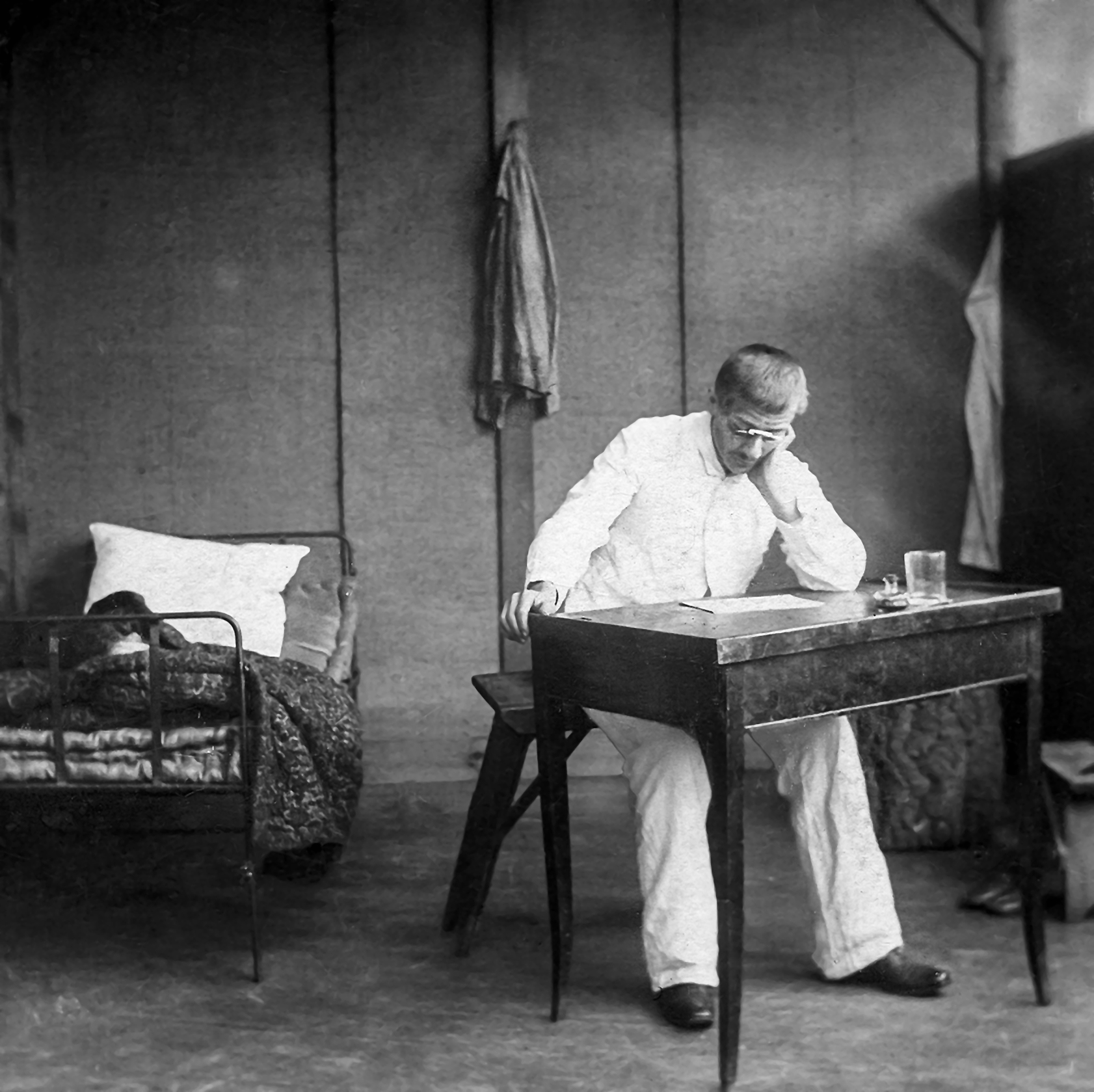
Alfred Dreyfus in his room on Devil's Island in 1898, cropped from a stereograph sold by F. Hamel, Altona-Hamburg...; collection Fritz Lachmund

On 13 January 1898, Émile Zola touched off a new dimension in the Dreyfus affair, which became known simply as The Affair. The first great Dreyfusard intellectual, Zola was at the height of popularity: the twenty volumes of the Les Rougon-Macquart epic were being distributed in dozens of countries. He was a leader in the literary world and was fully conscious of it. To General Pellieux, he said at his trial, "I ask General Pellieux if there are not many ways to serve France? It can be served by the sword or by the pen. General Pellieux has probably won great victories! I have won mine, too. By my work the French language has been brought into the world. I have my victories! I bequeath to posterity the name of General Pellieux and that of Émile Zola: history will choose!"

Outraged by the acquittal of Esterhazy, Zola published a 4,500-word article on the front page of L'Aurore in the form of an open letter to President Félix Faure (Clemenceau thought up the headline J'Accuse...!). With a typical circulation of 30,000, the newspaper distributed nearly 300,000 copies that day. This article had the effect of an explosion. The article was a direct attack, explicit and clear, and named names. It denounced all those who had conspired against Dreyfus, including the minister of war and the General Staff. The article contained numerous errors, exaggerating or minimizing the roles of one or another of the figures involved (the role of General Mercier was greatly underestimated, for instance).

J'Accuse...! provided for the first time a compilation of all existing data on the affair in one place. Zola's goal was to make himself a target, to force the authorities to prosecute him. His trial forced a new public review of both the Dreyfus and Esterhazy affairs. Here he went against the strategy of Scheurer-Kestner and Lazare, who advocated patience and reflection. Thanks to the national and international success of Zola's article, a trial became inevitable. From that critical moment the case followed two parallel paths. On one hand, the state used its apparatus to impose a limitation on the trial, restricting it to one of simple libel so as to separate the Dreyfus and Esterhazy cases, which had already been adjudicated. On the other hand, conflicting camps of opinion tried to influence judges and the government—one side pushed to obtain a review and the other to convict Zola. But Zola achieved his aim: the opening of a public debate at the Assize Court.

On 15 January 1898, Le Temps published a petition calling for a retrial. It included the names of Émile Zola, Anatole France, director of the Pasteur Institute Émile Duclaux, Daniel Halévy, Fernand Gregh, Félix Fénéon, Marcel Proust, Lucien Herr, Charles Andler, Victor Bérard, François Simiand, Georges Sorel, the painter Claude Monet, the writer Jules Renard, the sociologist Émile Durkheim, and the historian Gabriel Monod.

On 20 January 1898, after an anti-Zola speech by rightist politician Albert de Mun at the Chamber of Deputies, the chamber voted 312–22 to prosecute Zola. On 23 January 1898 Clemenceau, in the name of a "peaceful revolt of the French spirit", picked up the term "intellectuals" and used it in L'Aurore, but in a positive sense. On 1 February 1898, Barres lambasted the intellectuals in Le Journal. Anti-intellectualism became a major theme of right-wing intellectuals, who accused the Dreyfusards of failing to put the nation's interests first, an argument that continued throughout the years that followed and which became the basis of the public debate: a choice between justice and truth on the one hand, and the defense of the nation, preservation of society, and superiority of the state on the other. At first, the political left did not echo this mobilization of intellectuals—on 19 January 1898 Socialist Deputies distanced themselves from the "two rival bourgeois factions".

=== The trial of Zola ===
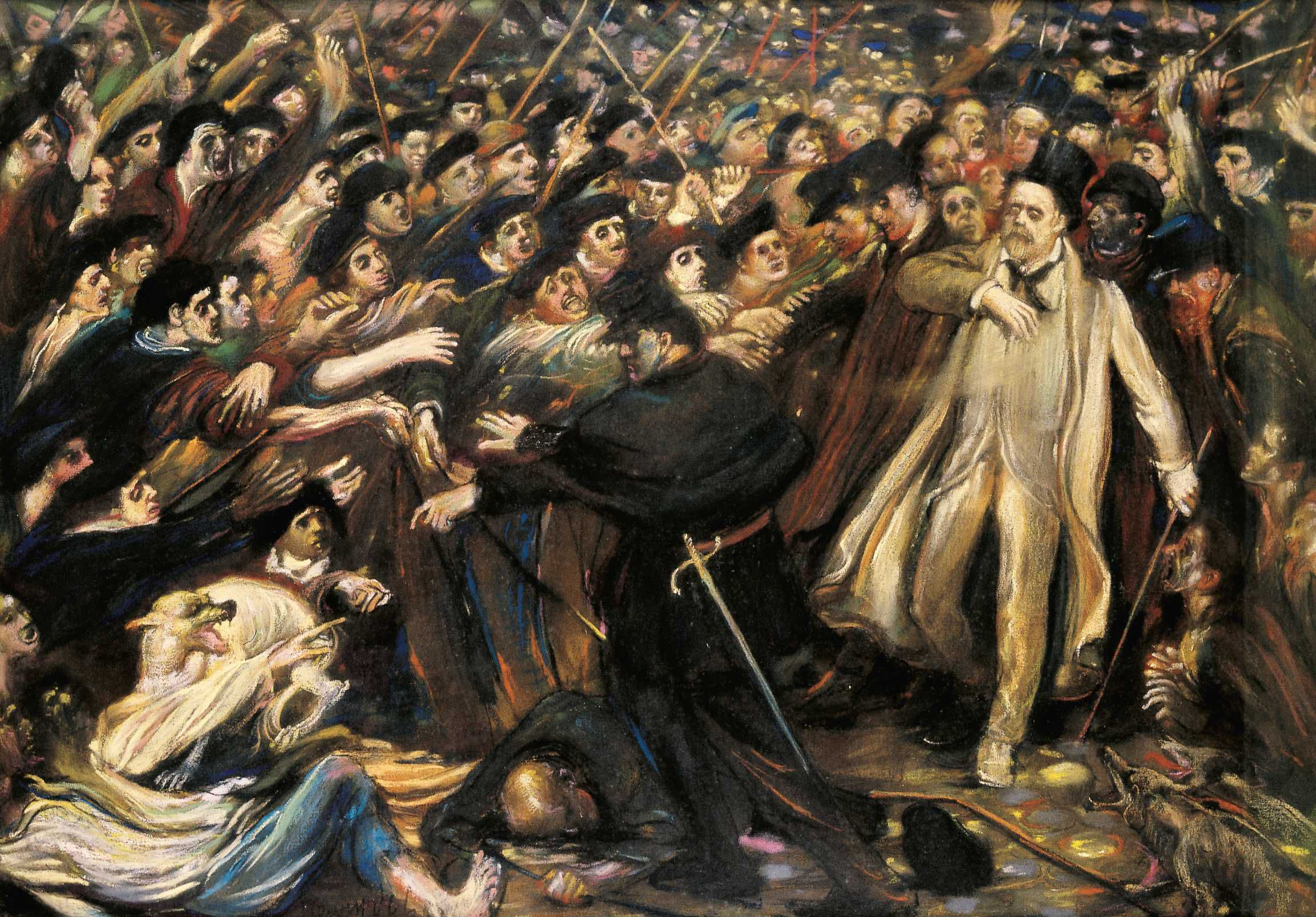
Henry de Groux, Zola faces the mob, oil on canvas, 1898

General Billot, Minister of War, filed a complaint against Zola and Alexandre Perrenx, the manager of L'Aurore, to be heard at the Assises of the Seine from 7 to 23 February 1898. Defamation of a public authority was liable to trial in the Cour d'Assises, while insults to private figures—such as journalists and intellectuals—uttered by the nationalist and antisemitic press were limited to the civil adversarial system. (The taxpayer is at risk in the first case, while only the plaintiff is at risk in the second.) The minister referred to only three passages of Zola's article, eighteen lines out of hundreds. He accused Zola of having written that the court martial had committed "unlawful acts ... by order". The trial opened in an atmosphere of extreme violence—Zola had been the object of "the most shameful attacks" as well as important support and congratulations. (On 2 February, Octave Mirbeau, Laurent Tailhade, Pierre Quillard and Georges Courteline, among others, in L'Aurore signed an "Address to Émile Zola" assuring him of their support "in the name of justice and truth".)

Fernand Labori, Zola's lawyer, intended to call about 200 witnesses. The details of the Dreyfus affair, unknown to most of the public, were published in the press. Several papers, Le Siecle and L'Aurore among others, published shorthand notes verbatim of the debates every day to build support in the population. These notes were, for the Dreyfusards, an essential tool for later debates. The nationalists, behind Henri Rochefort, however, were more visible and organized riots, which forced the prefect of police to intervene to protect Zola whenever he left the facility after every hearing.

This trial was also the scene of a real legal battle in which the rights of the defence were constantly violated. Many observers were aware of the collusion between France's political and military worlds. Evidently the court received instructions not to raise the subject of former judicial errors. President Delegorgue, on the pretext of the long duration of the hearings, juggled the law incessantly to ensure that the trial dealt only with the alleged defamation by Zola. Delegorgue's phrase "the question will not be put" was repeated dozens of times.

Zola was sentenced to one year in prison and a fine of 3,000 francs, (Note: Octave Mirbeau paid 7,525 francs from his own pocket, which represented the fine and court costs on 8 August 1898.) which was the maximum penalty. This harshness was due to the atmosphere of violence surrounding the trial. "The excitement of the audience and the exasperation of the crowd in front of the courthouse were so violent that one could fear the worst excesses if the jury acquitted Mr. Zola". However, the Zola trial was rather a victory for the Dreyfusards. Indeed, the affair and its contradictions had been widely discussed throughout the trial, especially by the military. In addition, the violent attacks against Zola and the injustice of the conviction of Dreyfus reinforced the commitment of the Dreyfusards. Stéphane Mallarmé declared, "[I am] imbued by the admirable actions [of Zola]" and Jules Renard wrote in his diary: "From tonight I hold on to the Republic that inspires respect in me, a tenderness in me that I do not know. I declare that Justice is the most beautiful word in the language of men and I must cry if men no longer understand it". Senator Ludovic Trarieux and Catholic jurist Paul Viollet founded the League for the Defence of Human Rights. Even more than the Dreyfus affair the Zola affair resulted in a regrouping of intellectual forces into two opposing camps.

On 2 April 1898, an application to the Supreme Court received a favourable response. This was the court's first intervention in the affair. The court upheld the appeal, on the formal grounds that as the alleged libel was against the military court, rather than the minister, it was the military court that should have made the complaint. Prosecutor-General Manau supported a review of the Dreyfus trial and strongly opposed the antisemites. The judges of the military court, whom Zola had challenged, therefore opened a new suit against him for libel. The case was brought before the Assizes of Seine-et-Oise in Versailles, where the public was considered more favourable to the army and more nationalistic. On 23 May 1898, at the first hearing, Mr. Labori appealed to the Supreme Court regarding the change of jurisdiction, which adjourned the trial and postponed the hearing to 18 July 1898. Labori advised Zola to leave France for England before the end of the trial, which the writer did, departing for a one-year exile in England. The defendants were convicted again. As for Colonel Picquart, he found himself again in prison.

=== Antisemitic riots ===
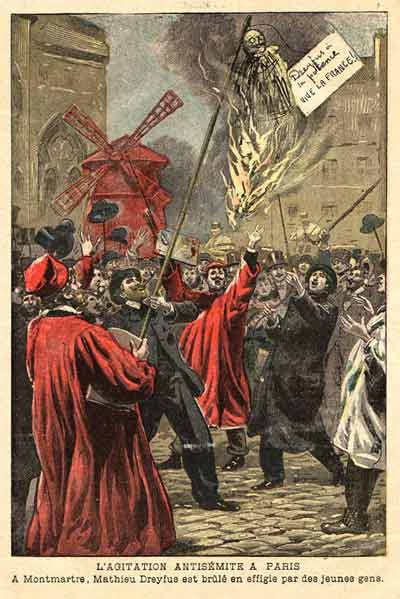
Antisemitic riots in a print from Le Petit Parisien

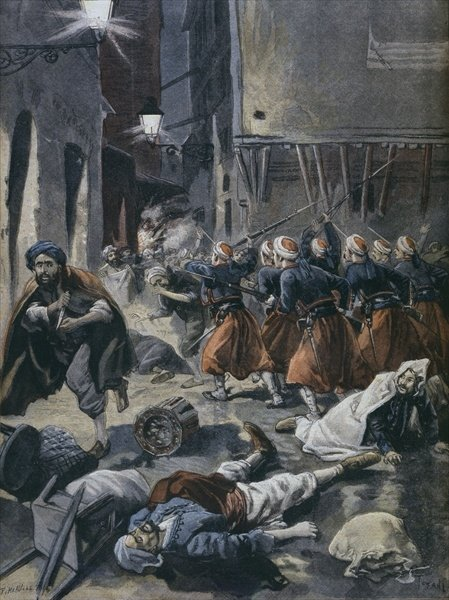
1898 antisemitic riots in Algiers

Antisemitic disturbances and riots broke out in 1898 in cities across Metropolitan France, mostly in January and February. Antisemitic riots predated the Dreyfus affair, and were almost a tradition in the East, which "the Alsatian people observed upon the outbreak of any revolution in France". But the 1898 disturbances were much more widespread.

There were three waves of unrest in 55 localities: the first ending the week of 23 January; the second wave in the week following; and the third wave from 23–28 February; these waves and other incidents totaled 69 riots or disturbances across the country. Additionally, riots took place in Algeria from 18–25 January. Demonstrators at these disturbances threw stones, chanted slogans, attacked Jewish property and sometimes Jewish people, and resisted police efforts to stop them. Mayors called for calm, and troops including cavalry were called in an attempt to quell the disturbances.

Zola's J'Accuse appeared on 13 January, and most historians suggest that the riots were spontaneous reactions to its publication, and to the subsequent Zola trial. The press reported that "tumultuous demonstrations broke out nearly every day". Prefects or police in various towns noted demonstrations in their localities, and associated them with "the campaign undertaken in favor of ex-Captain Dreyfus", or with the "intervention by M. Zola", or the Zola trial itself, which "seems to have aroused the antisemitic demonstrations". In Paris, demonstrations around the Zola trial were frequent and sometimes violent. Roger Martin du Gard reported that "Individuals with Jewish features were grabbed, surrounded, and roughed up by delirious youths who danced round them, brandishing flaming torches, made from rolled-up copies of L'Aurore.

However, the fervid reaction to the Dreyfus affair and especially the Zola trial was only partly spontaneous. In a dozen cities including Nantes, Lille, and Le Havre, antisemitic posters appeared in the streets, and riots followed soon after. At Saint-Etienne, posters read, "Imitate your brothers of Paris, Lyon, Marseille, Nantes, Toulouse ... join with them in demonstrating against the underhand attacks being made on the Nation." In Caen, Marseille, and other cities, riots followed antisemitic speeches or meetings, such as the meeting organized by the Comité de Défense Religieuse et Sociale in Caen.

=== Henry unmasked, the case is rekindled ===
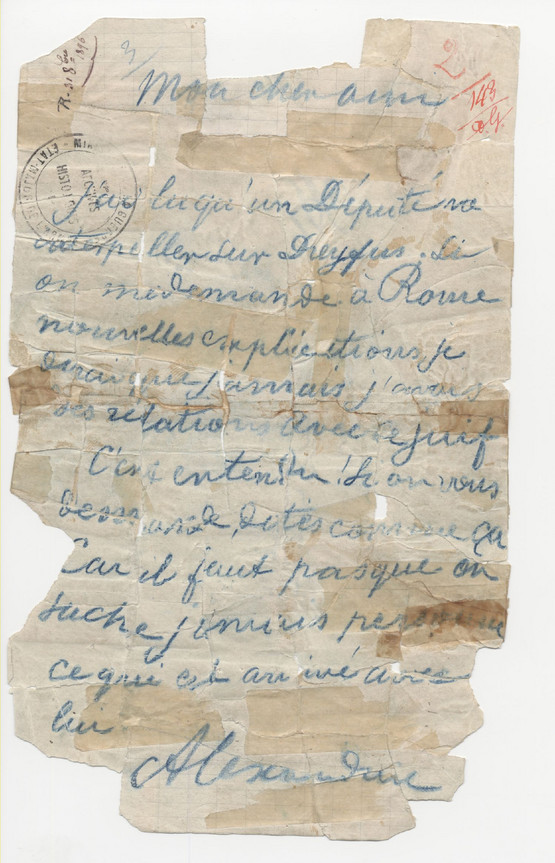
Photograph of the "faux Henry". The header ("my dear friend") and signature ("Alexandrine") are from Panizzardi. The rest is from the hand of Henry.

The acquittal of Esterhazy, the convictions of Émile Zola and of Georges Picquart, and the continued presence of an innocent man in prison had a considerable national and international effect. France was exposed as an arbitrary state, which contradicted its founding republican principles. Antisemitism made considerable progress and riots were common throughout the year 1898. However politicians were still in denial about the affair. In April and May 1898, they were mostly concerned with elections, in which Jaurès lost his seat of Carmaux. The majority was moderate, though a parliamentary group in the House was antisemitic. Nevertheless the cause of the Dreyfusards was restarted.

Godefroy Cavaignac, the new minister of war and a fierce supporter of anti-revisionism, definitely wanted to prove the guilt of Dreyfus and from there "wring the neck" of Esterhazy, whom he considered "a pathological liar and blackmailer". He was absolutely convinced of Dreyfus's guilt, a conviction reinforced by the legend of the confession (after meeting the main witness, Captain Lebrun-Renault). Cavaignac had the honesty of a doctrinaire intransigent, but absolutely did not know the depths of the affair—the General Staff had kept him in the dark. He was surprised to learn that all the documents on which the prosecution was based had not been expertly appraised and that Boisdeffre had "absolute confidence" in Henry. Cavaignac decided to investigate—in his office, with his assistants—and retrieved the secret file, which now contained 365 items.

On 4 April, the newspaper Le Siècle published Lettre d'un Diplomate, the first of four documents, that were of critical importance in exposing Esterhazy's guilt, and enabled the Dreyfusard cause to regain the initiative it had lost with Zola's conviction. The secret information had been provided by Zola, who had received it from Oscar Wilde; Wilde had gained it from best friend Carlos Blacker, who was an intimate friend of Alessandro Panizzardi.

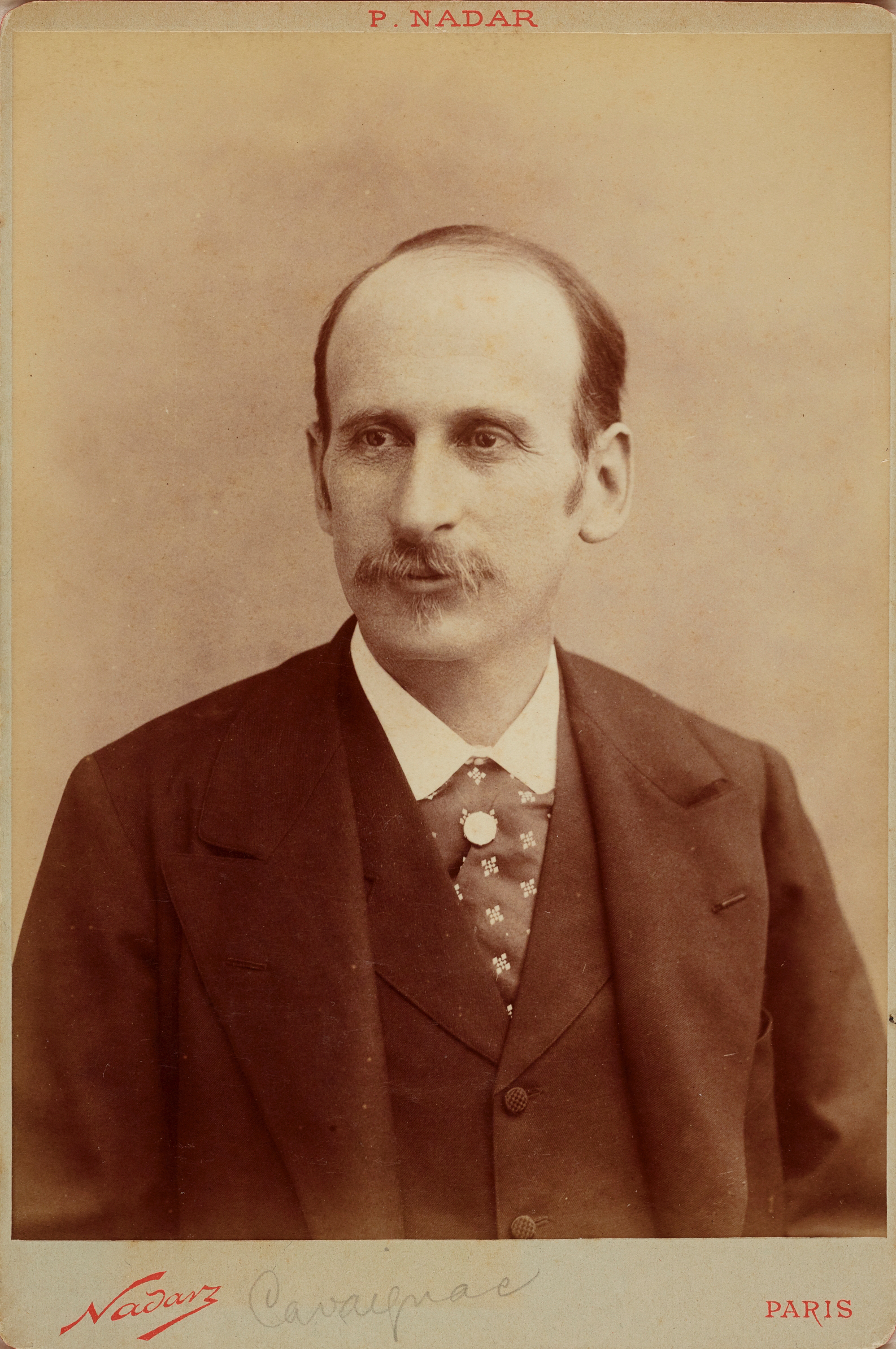
Portrait of Godefroy Cavaignac, Minister of War

On 7 July 1898, during a questioning in the National Assembly Cavaignac reported three items "overwhelming among a thousand", two of which had no connection with the case. The other was the "faux Henry". Cavaignac's speech was effective: the députés (deputies) gave him an ovation and voted to display copies of the three documents in the 36,000 communes of France. The anti-Dreyfusards had triumphed, but Cavaignac implicitly recognized that the Dreyfus's defence had not had access to all the evidence. The application for annulment made by Lucie Dreyfus became admissible. The next day, Picquart declared in Le Temps to the council president, "I am in a position to establish before a court of competent jurisdiction that the two documents bearing the date of 1894 could not be attributed to Dreyfus and that the one that bears the date of 1896 had all the characteristics of a fake", which earned him eleven months in prison.

On the evening of 13 August 1898, Louis Cuignet, who was attached to the cabinet of Cavaignac, was working by the light of a lamp and observed that the colour of the lines on the "faux Henry" paper header and footer did not correspond with the central part of the document. Cavaignac was still trying to find logical reasons for the guilt and conviction of Dreyfus but was not silent on this discovery. A board of inquiry was formed to investigate Esterhazy, before which he panicked and confessed his secret reports to Major du Paty de Clam. Collusion between the General Staff and the traitor was revealed. On 30 August 1898 Cavaignac resigned himself to demanding explanations from Colonel Henry in the presence of Boisdeffre and Gonse. After an hour of questioning by the minister himself, Henry broke down and made a full confession. He was placed under arrest at the Mont-Valérien fortress, where he killed himself the next day by cutting his own throat with a razor. The request for review filed by Lucie Dreyfus could not be rejected. Yet Cavaignac said "less than ever!", but the president of the council, Henri Brisson, forced him to resign. Despite his apparently entirely involuntary role in the revision of the 1894 trial Cavaignac remained convinced that Dreyfus was guilty and made a statement disparaging and offensive to Dreyfus at the Rennes trial.

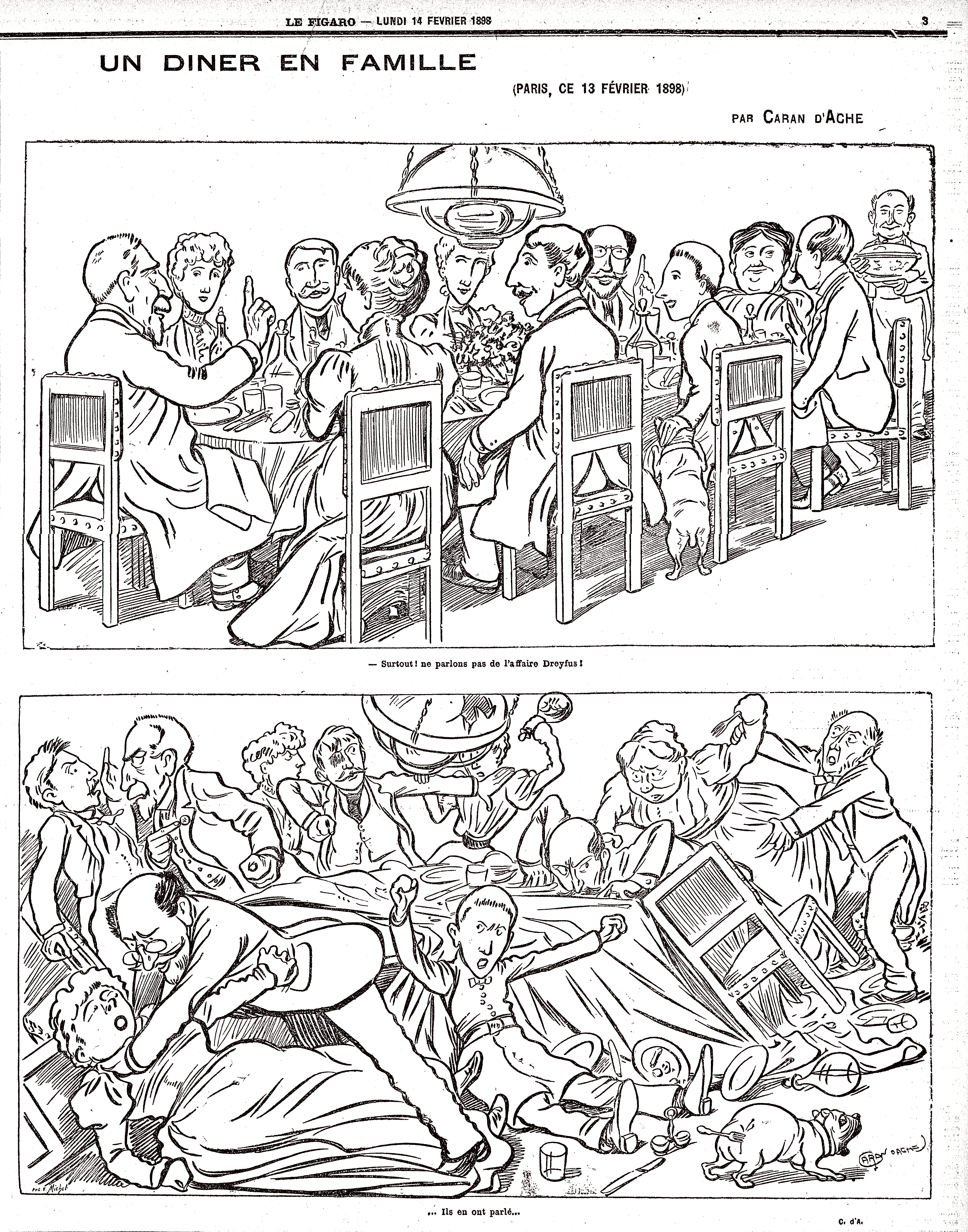
Drawing by Caran d'Ache in Le Figaro on 14 February 1898

The anti-revisionists did not consider themselves beaten. On 6 September 1898 Charles Maurras published a eulogy of Henry in La Gazette de France in which he called him a "heroic servant of the great interests of the State". La Libre Parole, Drumont's antisemitic newspaper, spread the notion of "patriotic fake" ("faux patriotique"). In December the same newspaper launched a subscription, in favour of his widow, to erect a monument to Henry. Each gift was accompanied by pithy, often abusive, remarks on Dreyfus, the Dreyfusards, and the Jews. Some 14,000 subscribers, including 53 deputies, sent 131,000 francs. On 3 September 1898, Brisson, the president of the council, urged Mathieu Dreyfus to file an application for review of the military court of 1894. The government transferred the case to the Supreme Court for its opinion on the past four years of proceedings.

France was thoroughly divided into two, but several things remain clear: the Jewish community had little involvement, intellectuals were not all Dreyfusards, (Note: Of the 40 members of the French Academy Anatole France was the only revisionist.) the Protestants were divided, and Marxists refused to support Dreyfus. The split transcended religion and social background, as shown in a cartoon by Caran d'Ache, "A Family Dinner": before, "Above all, never talk about it!"; after, "They talked about it".

=== Crisis and reshaping the political landscape ===
Henry was dead, Boisdeffre had resigned, Gonse had no more authority, and du Paty had been severely compromised by Esterhazy: for the conspirators it was a débâcle. The government was now caught between two fires: the nationalist pressure on the street and the higher command. Cavaignac, having resigned for continuing to spread his anti-Dreyfusard vision of the affair, arose as an anti-revisionist leader. General Zurlinden who succeeded him and was influenced by the General Staff, delivered a negative opinion at the review on 10 September 1898 comforting the extremist press by saying that, "a review means war". The obstinacy of the government, who voted to revert to the Supreme Court on 26 September 1898, led to the resignation of Zurlinden who was soon replaced by General Chanoine. When Chanoine was questioned in the House he handed in his resignation; trust was denied to Brisson and he was also forced to resign. Ministerial instability caused some governmental instability.

On 1 November 1898, the Progressive Charles Dupuy was appointed in place of Brisson. In 1894 he had covered the actions of General Mercier at the beginning of the Dreyfus affair, and four years later he announced that he would follow the judgment of the Supreme Court, thus blocking the road for those who wanted to stifle the review and divest the Court. On 5 December 1898 in the shadow of a debate in the House on the transmission of the "secret file" to the Supreme Court the tension rose another notch. Insults, invective, and other nationalistic violence gave way to threats of an uprising. Paul Déroulède declared: "If there has to be a civil war so be it."

A new crisis arose at the same time in the heart of the Supreme Court, since Quesnay de Beaurepaire, president of the Civil Chamber, accused the Criminal Chamber of Dreyfusism in the press. He resigned on 8 January 1899 as a hero of the nationalist cause. This crisis led to the divestiture of the Criminal Division in favour of joint chambers. This was the point of blockage for the review.

In 1899, the Dreyfus affair took up more and more of the political scene. On 16 February 1899, Félix Faure, the President of France and a fierce opponent of the review, died of a heart attack. Émile Loubet was elected, which was an advance for the cause of the review. On 23 February 1899 at the funeral for Faure, Paul Déroulède, a deputy who belonged to the League of Patriots, attempted to force a coup at the Élysée Palace. It was a failure as it was not supported by the military. On 4 June 1899 Loubet was assaulted at the Longchamp Racecourse. These provocations plus permanent demonstrations from the extreme right, although it never actually put the Republic in danger, created a burst of Republicanism leading to the formation of a "government of republican defence" around Waldeck-Rousseau on 22 June 1899. The center of French politics, including Raymond Poincaré, had aligned itself with the pro-revisionists. The progressive anti-Dreyfusard Republicans, such as Jules Méline, were rejected outright. The Dreyfus affair led to a clear reorganization of the French political landscape.

=== The appeal on the judgment of 1894 ===
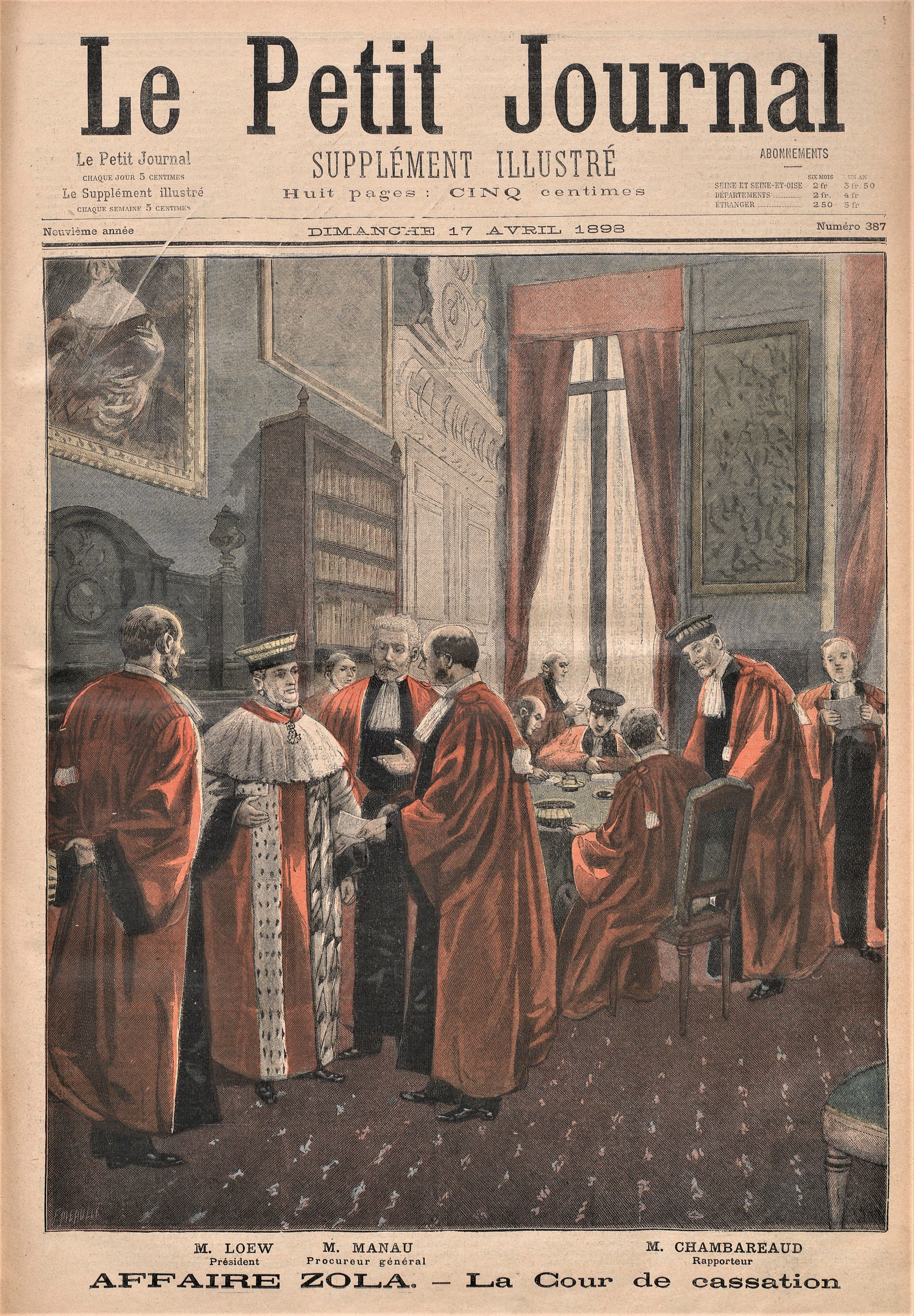
The judges of the criminal division in Le Petit Journal

The Supreme Court considered the Dreyfus affair in the context of press campaigns against the Criminal Division, the magistrates being constantly dragged through the mud in nationalist newspapers from the Panama scandals. On 26 September 1898, after a Cabinet vote, the Minister of Justice appealed to the Supreme Court. On 29 October 1898, after the submission of the report from the recorder Alphonse Bard, the Criminal Chamber of the Court stated that "the application is admissible and will proceed with a supplementary investigation".

The recorder Louis Loew presided. He was subjected to a very violent campaign of antisemitic insults due to his being an Alsatian Protestant accused of being a deserter and tainted by the Prussians. Despite the compliant silence of Mercier, Billot, Zurlinden, and Roget, who hid behind the authority of "already judged" and "state secret", understanding of the affair increased. Cavaignac made a statement two days long, but failed to prove the guilt of Dreyfus. On the contrary, he unwittingly exonerated him by a demonstration of the exact date of the bordereau (August 1894).

Picquart then demonstrated all the workings of the error, then the conspiracy. In a decision dated 8 December 1898 in response to his divestiture announcement, Picquart was protected from the military court by the Criminal Division of the Supreme Court. This was a new obstacle to the wishes of the General Staff. A new furiously antisemitic press campaign burst during the event, while L'Aurore on 29 October 1898 published an article entitled Victory in the same character as J'accuse...! The work of the investigation was still to be taken back by the Criminal Division. The "secret file" was analyzed from 30 December 1898 and the Criminal Division requested disclosure of diplomatic records, which was granted.

On 9 February 1899, the Criminal Division submitted its report by highlighting two important facts: it was certain Esterhazy used the same paper as the bordereau, and the secret file was completely void. These two major events alone destroyed all proceedings against Alfred Dreyfus. In parallel, President Mazeau conducted an inquiry by the Criminal Division, which led to divestiture thereof "to not only leave it to bear alone all responsibility for the final decision", so protecting the Criminal Division from actions arising from its report.

On 28 February 1899, Waldeck-Rousseau spoke to the Senate on the floor and denounced "moral conspiracy" within the government and in the street. The review was no longer avoidable. On 1 March 1899, Alexis Ballot-Beaupré, the new president of the Civil Chamber of the Supreme Court, was appointed recorder for the consideration of the application for review. He took on the legal files and decided on a further investigation. Ten additional witnesses were interviewed, which further weakened the version of the General Staff. In the final discussion, President Ballot-Beaupré demonstrated the inanity of the bordereau, which was the only evidence against Dreyfus. The prosecutor Manau echoed the views of the President. Mornard, who represented Lucie Dreyfus, argued without any difficulty or opposition from the prosecution.

On 3 June 1899, the joint chambers of the Supreme Court overturned the judgment of 1894 in a formal hearing. The case was referred to the Military Court of Rennes. By that judgment, the Supreme Court imposed itself as an absolute authority capable of standing up to military and political power. For many Dreyfusards, this ruling was the prelude to the acquittal of the captain; they forgot to consider that it was again the army who would judge. The court, in overturning the judgement, believed in the legal autonomy of the military court without taking into account the laws of esprit de corps.

=== Fear of boycott ===
Hannah Arendt wrote that fear of an international boycott of the Paris Exposition of 1900 was what "united the disrupted country, turned parliament in favor of a retrial and eventually reconciled disparate elements" of France in a way "Clemenceau's daily editorials, Zola's pathos, Jaurès' speeches and popular hatred of the clergy and aristocracy" had not.

== The trial in Rennes (1899) ==
=== Conduct of the trial ===
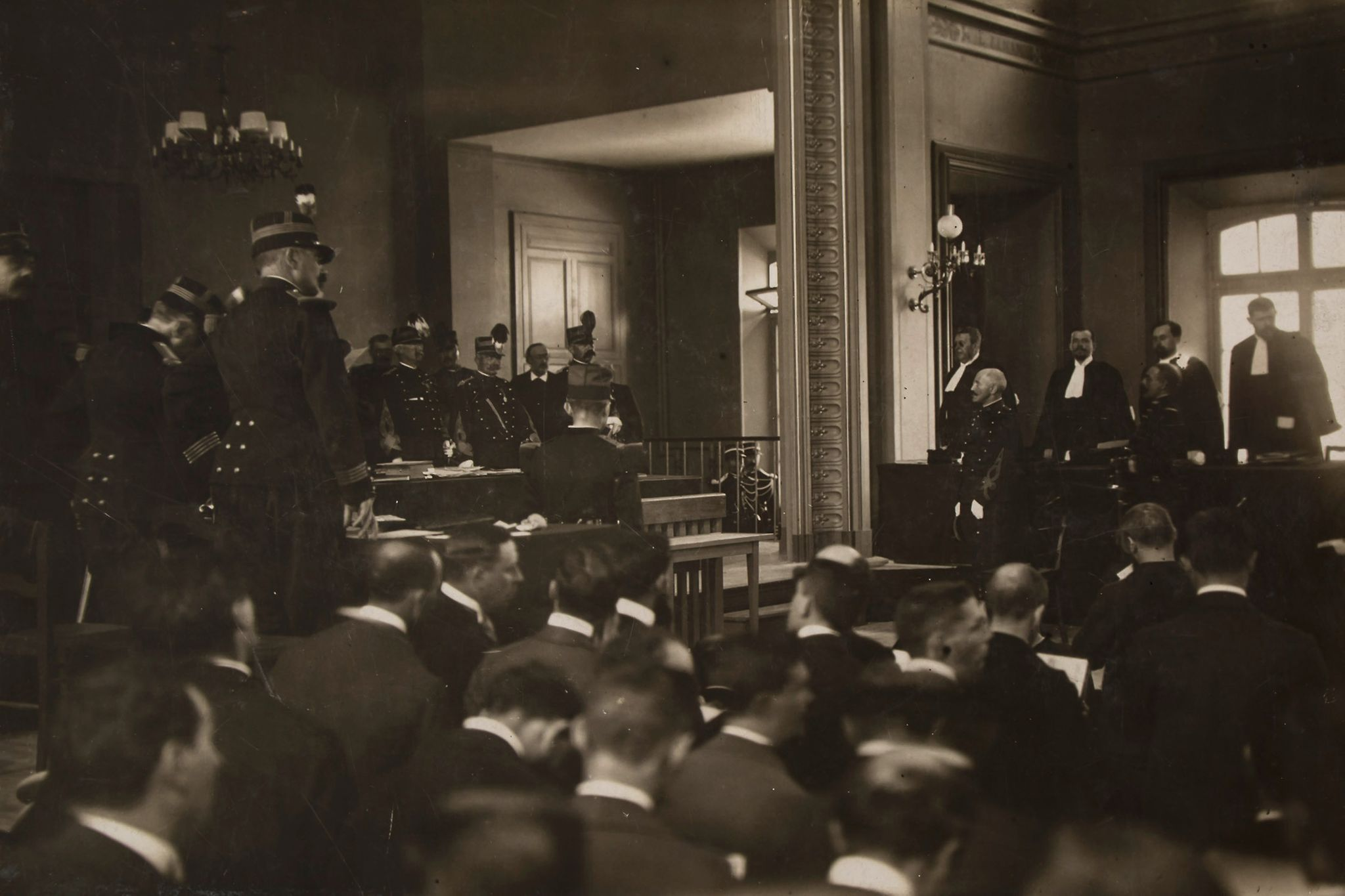
Alfred Dreyfus (standing, right of centre) at the opening session of his trial in Rennes, photographed by Valerian Griboedov

Alfred Dreyfus was in no way aware of what was happening thousands of kilometres from him. Neither was he aware of the schemes hatched to guarantee that he could never return, or the commitment of countless men and women to his cause. The prison administration filtered information deemed confidential. At the end of 1898, he learned with astonishment the actual size of the affair, about which he knew nothing: the accusation by his brother against Esterhazy, the acquittal of the traitor, Henry's confession and suicide, and the reading of the record of investigations of the Supreme Court, which he received two months after its publication. On 5 June 1899, Alfred Dreyfus was notified of the decision of the Supreme Court on the judgment of 1894. On 9 June 1899, he left Devil's Island, heading to France, but locked in a cabin as if guilty, even though he no longer was. He disembarked on 30 June 1899 in Port Haliguen on the Quiberon peninsula in the greatest secrecy, "a clandestine and nocturnal return". After five years of imprisonment, he was on his native soil, but he was immediately locked up from 1 July 1899 in the military prison in Rennes. He was remanded on 7 August 1899 before the military court of the Breton capital.

General Mercier, champion of the anti-Dreyfusards, intervened constantly in the press to confirm the accuracy of the first judgement: Dreyfus was surely guilty. Immediately, however, dissent emerged in the defence of Dreyfus. His two lawyers actually had opposing strategies. Demange wanted to stand on the defensive and just get the acquittal of Dreyfus. Labori, a brilliant lawyer who was just 35 years old, wanted to take the offensive, to aim higher and defeat and publicly humiliate the General Staff. Mathieu Dreyfus imagined a complementarity between the two lawyers. The conduct of the trial revealed the disunity that served the prosecution with a defence so impaired.

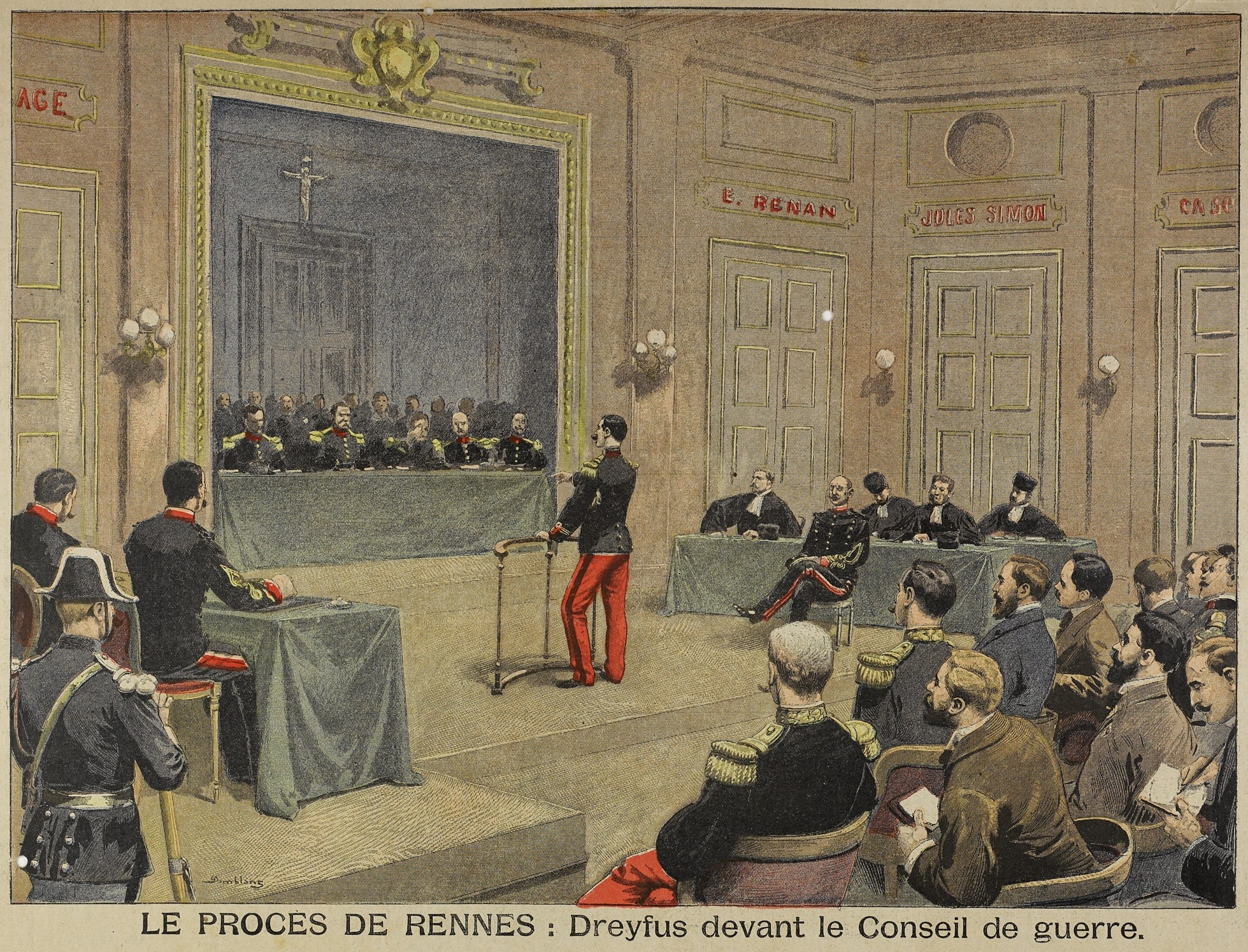
Alfred Dreyfus's trial at the Rennes Court Martial

The trial opened on 7 August 1899 in an atmosphere of extreme tension. Rennes was in a state of siege. The judges of the court-martial were under pressure. Esterházy, who admitted authorship of the bordereau, was in exile in England. He and du Paty were both excused. On the appearance of Dreyfus, emotions ran high. His physical appearance disturbed his supporters and some of his opponents. (Note: Maurice Barrès made a poignant description of Dreyfus.) Despite his deteriorated physical condition, he had a complete mastery of the files acquired in only a few weeks. All the General Staff testified against Dreyfus without providing any proof. They stubbornly considered null and void the confessions of Henry and Esterhazy. The trial even tended to go out of control to the extent that the decisions of the Supreme Court were not taken into account. They discussed in particular the bordereau, which was the proof of guilt of Esterhazy. Nevertheless Mercier was booed at the end of the hearing. The nationalist press and the anti-Dreyfusards could only speculate on his silence about the "conclusive evidence" (the pseudo-note annotated by Emperor Wilhelm II, which nobody will ever see in evidence) that he had not ceased to report before the trial.

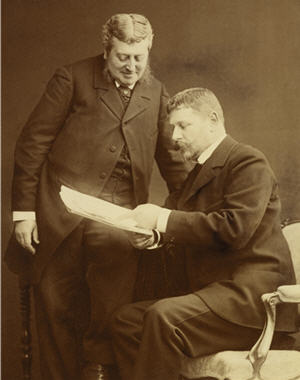
Dreyfus's defense in Rennes: Edgar Demange and Fernand Labori

On 14 August 1899, Labori was on his way to court when he was shot in the back by an extremist who escaped and was never found. The lawyer was missing from discussions for over a week at the decisive moment of the examination of witnesses. On 22 August 1899, his condition had improved and he returned. Incidents between the two lawyers for Dreyfus multiplied. Labori reproached Demange about his excessive caution. The government, in the face of the military hardening stance, still had two ways to influence events: call for testimony from Germany or abandon the charge. These negotiations in the background, however, had no result. The German Embassy sent a polite refusal to the government. The Minister of War, General Gaston de Galliffet, sent respectful word to Major Louis Carrière, the government commissioner. He asked him to act in the spirit of the revised judgment of the Supreme Court. The officer pretended not to understand the allusion and helped the nationalist lawyer Auffray to make the indictment against Dreyfus. The defence needed to make a decision because the outcome of the case looked bad, despite evidence of the absence of charges against the accused. On behalf of the president of the council, Pierre Waldeck-Rousseau, aided by Zola and Jaurès, Labori was convinced to give up his argument so as not to offend the military. They decided to risk conciliation in exchange for the acquittal that seemed to be promised by the government. Mr. Demange, alone and without illusions, continued the defence of Dreyfus in an atmosphere of civil war. In Paris, the antisemitic and nationalist agitators of Auteuil were arrested. Jules Guérin and those who fled and holed up in Fort Chabrol were assaulted by the police.

=== New conviction ===
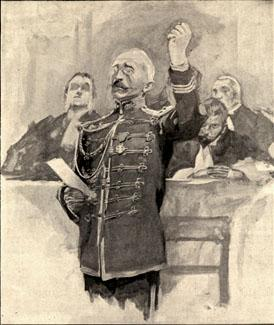
Dreyfus's reconviction. (Artistic licence portrays him with the Legion of Honour decoration he did not hold at the time.)

On 9 September 1899, the court rendered its verdict: Dreyfus was convicted of treason, but "with extenuating circumstances" (by five votes to two) and sentenced to ten years' imprisonment and a further degradation. Contrary to appearances, this verdict was on the verge of acquittal by one vote. The Code of Military Justice adopted the principle that a minority vote of three against four was an acquittal.

The day after the verdict, Alfred Dreyfus, after much hesitation, filed an appeal for a retrial. Waldeck-Rousseau, in a difficult position, tackled for the first time the possibility of a pardon. Dreyfus had to accept guilt. Exhausted, having been away from his family for too long, he accepted. The decree was signed by President Émile Loubet on 19 September 1899 and Dreyfus was released on 21 September 1899. Many Dreyfusards were frustrated by this final act. Public opinion welcomed this conclusion indifferently. France wanted civil peace and harmony on the eve of the Universal Exhibition of 1900 and before the big fight that the Republic was about to take for freedom of association and secularism.

It was in this spirit that on 17 November 1899, Waldeck-Rousseau filed an amnesty law covering "all criminal acts or misdemeanours related to the Dreyfus affair or that have been included in a prosecution for one of these acts" excluding only Alfred Dreyfus himself who was instead pardoned to be able to still seek acquittal. Many Dreyfusards protested as this indemnified not only Zola and Picquart against (further) punishment but also protected the real culprits. Despite these massive protests the bill was passed.

=== Reactions ===
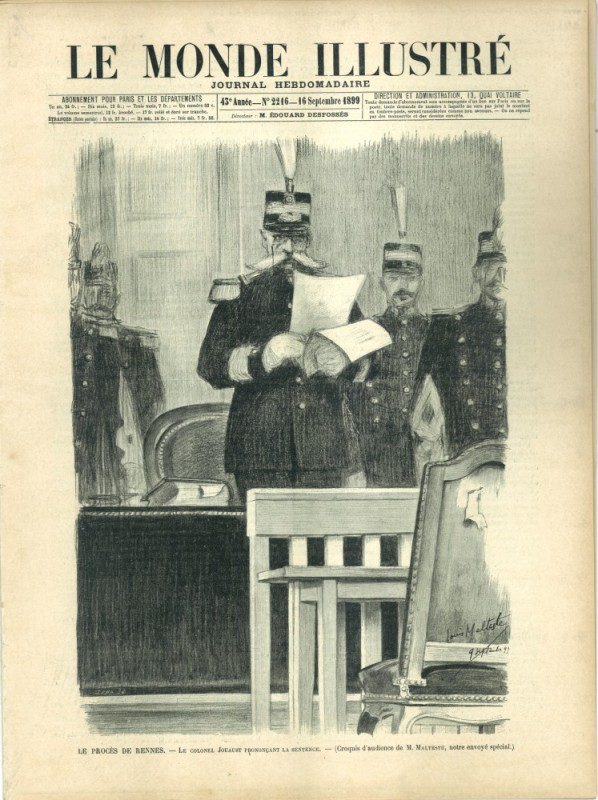
Cover of the weekly Le Monde illustré showing Colonel Albert Jouaust, Chairman of the Court Martial, reading the verdict of conviction

Reactions in France were strong, consisting of "shock and sadness" in the revisionist camp. Still other reactions tended to show that the "verdict of appeasement" made by the judges was understood and accepted by the population. The Republicans sought above all social peace and to turn the page on this extremely long and controversial affair. Also there were very few demonstrations in the provinces while agitation persisted somewhat in Paris. In the military world appeasement was also essential. Two of the seven judges voted for acquittal. They refused to yield to the implied military order. This was also clearly seen. In an apostrophe for the army, Galliffet announced: "The incident is closed".

Anti-French demonstrations took place in twenty foreign capitals and the press was outraged. Reactions were twofold. Norwegian composer Edvard Grieg cancelled his concerts in France in protest. The British, as legalists, focused on espionage and challenged rather strongly this conviction devoid of positive arguments in its construction. As such the report of the Lord Chief Justice of England, Lord Russell of Killowen, on 16 September 1899, was a symbol of the global effect of the affair in the United Kingdom. Russell, who went as an observer to Rennes, criticised the weaknesses of the Military Court:

The Military judges were not familiar with the law or criminal proceedings. They lacked the experience and skill that can see the evidence behind the evidence. They were drowning in prejudice and they acted according to what they saw as the honour of the army. Impressed, full of respect for their superiors, they accorded too much importance to fragile allegations that were only made against the accused." Thus he concluded: "For surely it might have been predicted with certainty that, if the revision trial had taken place before the Cour de cassation ... Dreyfus would now be a free man.

In Germany and Italy, the two countries widely challenged by lawsuits against Dreyfus, there was relief. Even if the German Emperor regretted that the innocence of Dreyfus was not recognized, the normalization of future Franco-German relations was seen as a welcome relaxation. Diplomacy between the three powers, with the help of Britain, sought to relax in an atmosphere that deteriorated again on the eve of the First World War.

This judicial conclusion also had an unfortunate consequence for the relationship between the Dreyfus family and the branch of Ultra-Dreyfusards. Fernand Labori, Jaures, and Clemenceau, with the consent of Picquart openly accused Alfred Dreyfus of accepting the pardon and only gently protesting the amnesty law.

== Rehabilitation (1900–1906) ==
Preferring to avoid a third trial, the government decided to pardon Dreyfus by a decree signed by President Émile Loubet on 19 September 1899 after much hesitation. Dreyfus was not found innocent. The rehabilitation process was not completed until six years later, when passions had cooled. Many books appeared during this period. In addition to the memoires of Alfred Dreyfus, Reinach published his History of the Dreyfus Affair and Jaurès published The Proofs. As for Zola, he wrote the third of his Gospels: Truth. Even Esterhazy took advantage of his secrets and sold several different versions of the text of his statement to the consul of France.

=== Death of Zola ===
On 29 September 1902, Zola, who was the initiator of The Affair and the first of the intellectual Dreyfusards, died, asphyxiated by fumes from his chimney. His wife, Alexandrine, narrowly escaped. It was a shock for the Dreyfusard clan. Anatole France, who demanded that Dreyfus be present at the funeral while the Chief of Police wanted his absence "to avoid problems", read his funeral oration for the author of J'accuse...!

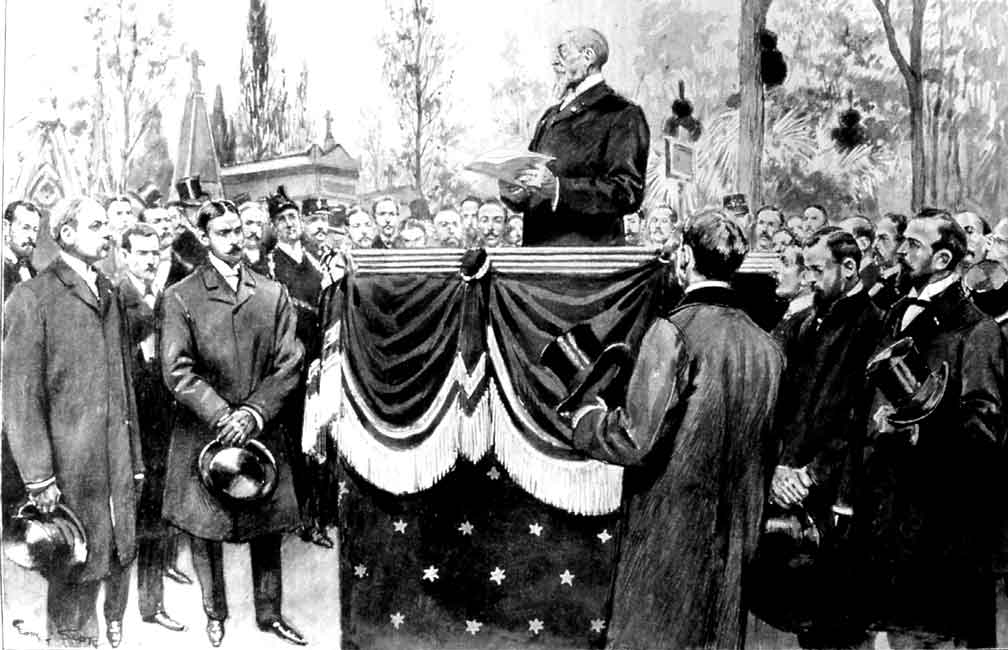
The funeral of Zola, where Anatole France paid homage to his friend

In 1953, the newspaper Libération published a death-bed confession by a Parisian roofer that he had murdered Zola by blocking the chimney of his house.

=== The semi-rehabilitation ===
==== Legal rehabilitation ====
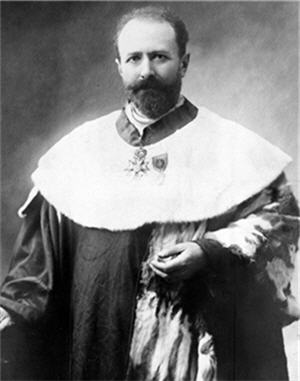
Manuel Baudoin, attorney general at the heart of the rehabilitation of Dreyfus

The elections of 1902 saw the victory of the left. Jean Jaurès was re-elected and he revived the affair on 7 April 1903 while France thought the affair buried forever. In a speech Jaurès evoked the long list of falsehoods peppering the Dreyfus case, and placed particular emphasis on two things. First, the letter of resignation from Pellieux, which was worded in very harsh terms. Legally, it formed an admission of the collusion of the General Staff:

[It] dupes people without honour [and] can no longer rely on the trust of subordinates, without which command is impossible. For my side I can not trust any of my chiefs who have been working on falsehoods, I ask for my retirement.

In addition, the note was allegedly annotated (by Kaiser Wilhelm II), which General Mercier had alluded to at the Rennes trial, which was reported by the press to have influenced the judges of the Military Court. (Note: Faced with the evidence that the identity of the writer of the bordereau was Esterházy, the General Staff had spread the rumour that the bordereau was in fact copied from a note that was even commented in the handwriting of the German Emperor Wilhelm II. This allowed the people behind the rumours to explain the secrecy surrounding the whole affair, and the transmission of the "secret file" in 1894. Evidently, nobody ever found any evidence of these convenient assertions.)

Given these developments, General Louis André, the new Minister of War, led an investigation at the instigation of Émile Combes and assisted by judges. The investigation was conducted by Captain Antoine Louis Targe, aide to the minister. During searches of the Statistics Section he discovered numerous documents, most of which were obviously fabricated. In November 1903 a report was submitted to the Minister of Justice by the Minister of War. This was in compliance with the regulations since the Minister found an error committed by the Military Court. This was the beginning of a new review led by lawyer Ludovic Trarieux, the founder of the League of Human Rights, with a thorough investigation to run over two years. The years 1904 and 1905 were devoted to different legal phases before the Court of Cassation. The court identified three events (grounds) for review, the demonstration of the falsification of the Panizzardi telegram, demonstration of a date change on a document in the 1894 trial (April 1895 changed to April 1894) and demonstration of the fact that Dreyfus had not removed the minutes related to heavy artillery in the army.

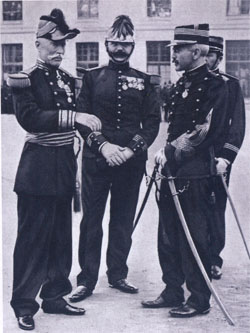
At right, Captain Alfred Dreyfus rehabilitated at Les Invalides, talks with General Gillain. In the centre, Targe, investigator and discoverer of many falsehoods.

With regard to the writing of the bordereau, the court was particularly severe against Alphonse Bertillon, who "reasoned badly on forged documents". The report (Note: Among the experts consulted, the contribution of the mathematician and physicist Henri Poincaré was noted.) showed that the writing was certainly by Esterhazy and that the latter had also confessed subsequently. Finally the Court demonstrated by a comprehensive and skilled analysis of the bordereau the futility of this purely intellectual construction and a commission of four headed by a general of artillery, General Sebert, maintained "it is highly unlikely that an artillery officer could write this missive".

On 9 March 1905, Attorney-General Baudouin delivered an 800-page report in which he demanded the convictions be quashed without further reference to another court and denounced the army. He began a divestiture of the military justice system, which did not conclude until 1982. It was not until 12 July 1906 that the Court of Cassation unanimously cancelled the judgment without reference to the military trial at Rennes in 1899 and pronounced "the end of the rehabilitation of Captain Dreyfus". The anti-Dreyfusards protested at this hasty rehabilitation. The goal was obviously political: it was to finish and finally turn the page. Nothing could dent the conviction of the opponents of Dreyfus. This method was the most direct and most definitive. What was annulled not only put a stop to Rennes, but the entire chain of prior acts, beginning with the arraignment order given by General Saussier in 1894. The Court focused on the legal aspects only and observed that Dreyfus did not have a duty to be returned before a Military Court for the simple reason that it should never have taken place due to the total absence of charges:

Whereas in the final analysis of the accusation against Dreyfus nothing remains standing and setting aside the judgment of the Military Court leaves nothing that can be considered to be a crime or misdemeanour; therefore by applying the final paragraph of Article 445 no reference to another court should be pronounced.

==== Subsequent career ====
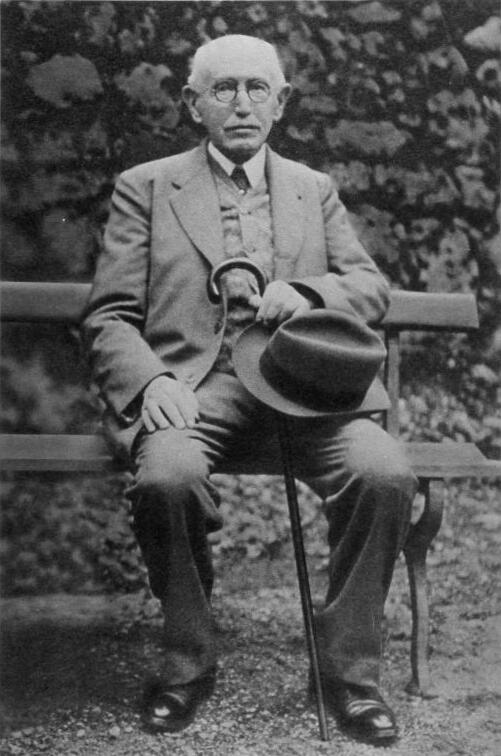
Alfred Dreyfus in 1935, the year of his death

Dreyfus was reinstated in the army with the rank of artillery major by law on 13 July 1906. This reflected the rank to which he could reasonably have been expected to have risen had his career not been interrupted by the false charges against him. However, Dreyfus and his supporters were disappointed that his five years of imprisonment were not taken into account for the reconstruction of his career and that his promotion to major was back-dated only to 10 July 1903. This decision blocked any hope of a career worthy of his past successes before his arrest in 1894. After serving for a year as commander of the artillery depot at Fort Neuf de Vincennes, Major Dreyfus retired in June 1907; a decision taken in part because of recurrent tropical fevers and chronic fatigue arising from the strain of his imprisonment.

On 4 June 1908, on the occasion of the transfer of the ashes of Émile Zola to the Pantheon, Alfred Dreyfus was the target of an attack. Louis Grégori, an extreme right-wing journalist and assistant of Drumont, fired two shots from a revolver and wounded Dreyfus slightly in the arm. He was driven to do this for Action Française (French Action) not only to disrupt the ceremony for the "two traitors" Zola and Dreyfus, but also to remake the Dreyfus trial through a new trial, a revenge of some sort. The trial was at the Assises of the Seine, where Grégori was acquitted – the latest in a long series of judicial misconducts. It was an occasion for new antisemitic riots that the government suppressed half-heartedly.

As a reserve officer, Dreyfus participated in the First World War of 1914–1918, serving as head of the artillery depot at a fortified camp near Paris and commander of a supply column. In 1917 he saw frontline service at the Chemin des Dames and Verdun. Apart from Major Du Paty de Clam, Dreyfus was the only officer directly involved in the affair to serve in the war. Having been named as a Chevalier of the Legion of Honour at the time of his reinstatement in 1906, Dreyfus was promoted to the rank of officer of the Legion of Honour in 1919. His son, Pierre Dreyfus, also served in World War I as an artillery officer and was awarded the Croix de Guerre. Alfred Dreyfus's two nephews also fought as artillery officers in the French Army and both were killed. The same artillery piece (the Obusier de 120 mm C modèle 1890), the secrets of which Dreyfus was accused of revealing to the Germans, was among those used in blunting the early German offensives. He ended his military career as a colonel.

Dreyfus died on 12 July 1935 at the age of seventy-five. His funeral cortège passed through ranks assembled for Bastille Day celebrations at the Place de la Concorde and he was buried in Montparnasse Cemetery. Colonel Picquart was also officially rehabilitated and reintegrated into the army with the rank of brigadier general. Picquart was Minister of War from 1906 to 1909 in the first Clemenceau government; he died in January 1914 in a horse riding accident.

On July 21, 1935, The New York Times published a feature by Walter Littlefield headlined "Dreyfus Unaware to End He Had Been Victim of Plot ...". The piece fills two full pages and leads with the statement that the truth could not be published during Dreyfus's lifetime "because while he lived this would have caused him pain and resentment."

== Consequences of the Dreyfus affair ==
For some the Dreyfus affair marked French society as a tortured society. All sections of society were affected; some were devastated. According to Katrin Schultheiss, a modern historian:

The enduring significance of the Dreyfus Affair ... lies in its manifest embodiment of multiple narratives and multiple strands of historical causality. It shows how longstanding beliefs and tensions can be transformed ... into a juggernaut that alters the political and cultural landscape for decades. In the interest of increasing our understanding ... the complexities of that transformation should be recognized and analyzed rather than packaged for moral or political usefulness.

=== Political consequences ===
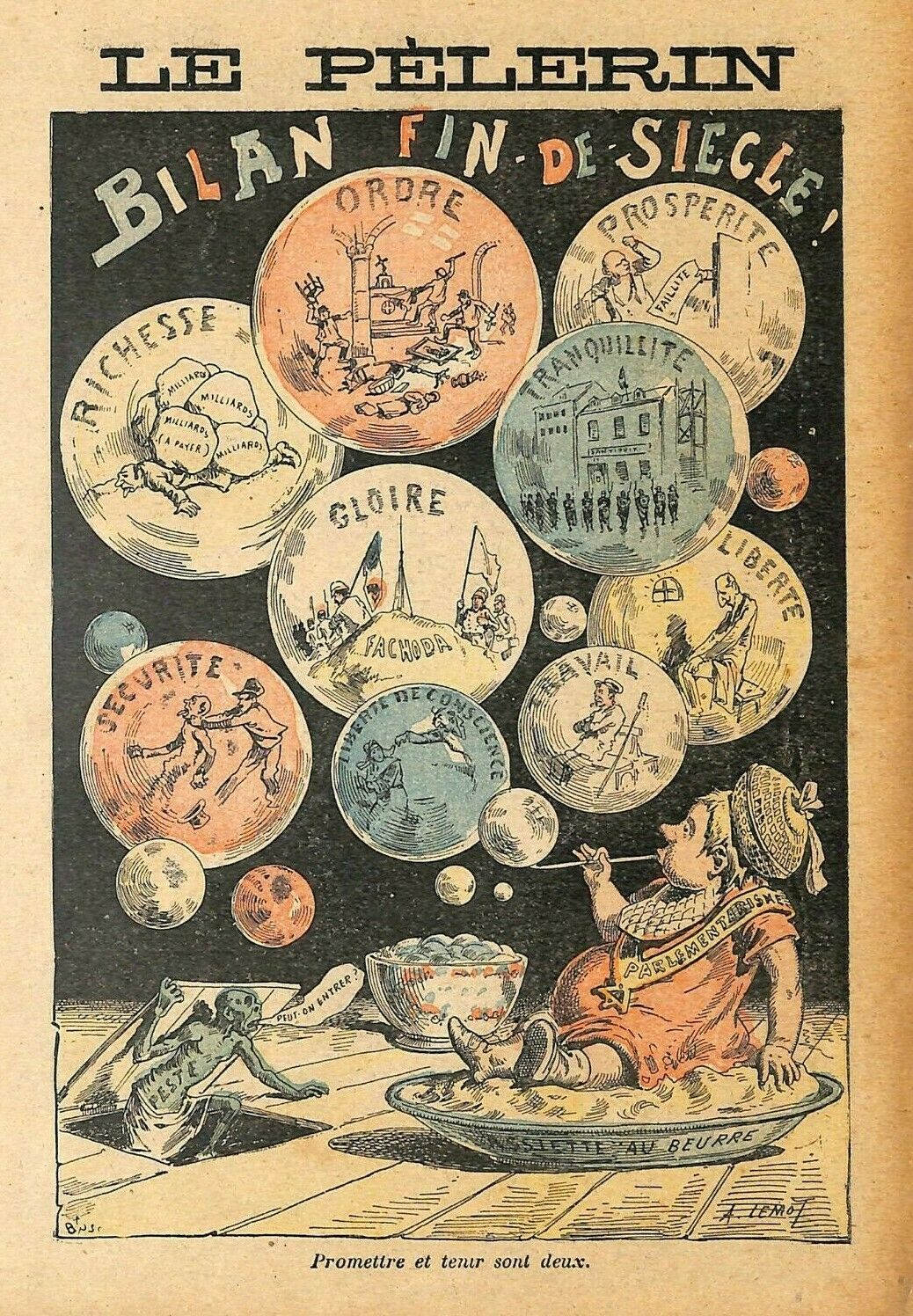
"Bilan fin de siècle" (assessment at the end of the century), anti-Republican caricature published in Le Pèlerin in 1900

The Dreyfus affair brought the confrontation between two sides of France to life. However, according to most historians, this opposition served the republican order. There was indeed a strengthening of parliamentary democracy and a failure of monarchist and reactionary forces.

The excessive violence of the nationalist parties brought together republicans in a united front, which defeated attempts to return to the old order. In the short term, progressive political forces from the elections of 1893 and confirmed in 1898 as a result of the Dreyfus affair disappeared in 1899. The shock trials of Esterhazy and Zola created a dreyfusian politics whose aim was to develop a republican consciousness and to fight against authoritarian nationalism, which expressed itself during the affair. For the uninhibited growth of populist nationalism was another major result of the event in French politics even though it did not originate from the Dreyfus affair. It grew out of the Boulanger affair, 1886–1889, and was shaped into a coherent theory by Maurice Barrès in 1892. Nationalism had its ups and downs, but managed to maintain itself as a political force under the name of Action Française, among others. On that occasion many republicans rallied to Vichy, without which the operation of the State would have been precarious, which showed the fragility of the republican institution in extreme circumstances. Upon liberation, Charles Maurras who was convicted on 25 January 1945 for acts of collaboration exclaimed at the verdict: "This is the revenge of Dreyfus!"

The other result was an intellectual mutation of socialism. Jaurès was a late Dreyfusard (January 1898) and was persuaded by revolutionary socialists. His commitment became unwavering alongside Georges Clemenceau and from 1899 under the influence of Lucien Herr. The year 1902 saw the birth of two parties: the French Socialist Party, which brought together jaurésiens; and the Socialist Party of France under the influence of Guesde and Vaillant. Both parties merged in 1905 as the French Section of the Workers' International (SFIO).

In addition, 1901 saw the birth of the Republican Radical and Radical-Socialist Party, the first modern political party, conceived as an electoral machine of the republican group. It had a permanent structure and relied on networks of Dreyfusards. The creation of the French League for Human Rights was contemporaneous with the affair, initially formed to defend Dreyfus. It was the hub of the intellectual left and extremely active at the beginning of the century, the conscience of the humanist left.

The final consequence on the political scene at the turn of the century saw a profound renewal of political personalities with the disappearance of great republican figures beginning with Auguste Scheurer-Kestner. Those who at the end of the century could weigh heavily on the events of the affair had now disappeared giving way to new men whose ambition was to reform and correct the errors and injustices of the past.

The Dreyfus affair created difficulties and blocked the way for improved relations between France and Italy after the customs war, as Italy was Europe's most Dreyfusard nation.

=== Social consequences ===
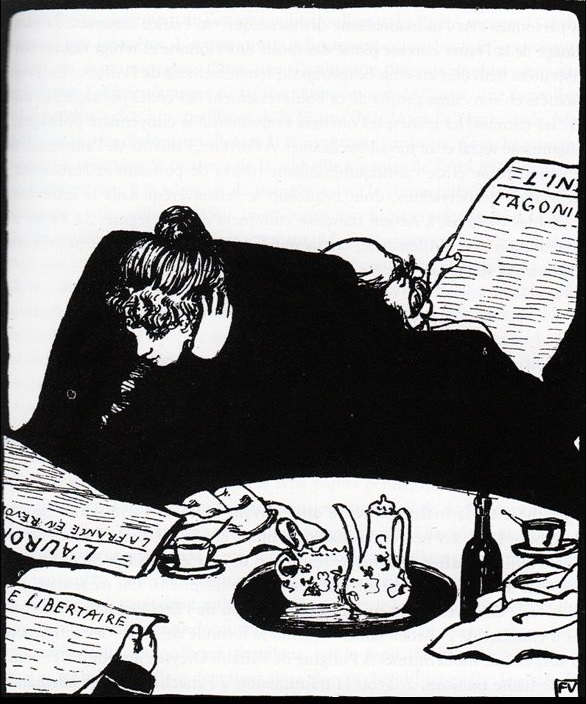
At Home, woodcut by Félix Vallotton in Le Cri de Paris. The Dreyfus affair lastingly cut France in two, even within families.

Socially, antisemitism was prominent. Existing prior to the Dreyfus affair, it had expressed itself during the Boulangisme affair and the Panama scandals but was limited to an intellectual elite. The Dreyfus affair spread hatred of Jews through all strata of society, a movement that certainly began with the success of Jewish France by Édouard Drumont in 1886. It was then greatly amplified by various legal episodes and press campaigns for nearly fifteen years. Antisemitism was from then on official and was espoused in numerous settings including the working classes. Candidates for the legislative elections took advantage of antisemitism as a watchword in parliamentary elections. This antisemitism was reinforced by the crisis of the separation of church and state in 1905, which probably led to its height in France. Antisemitic actions were permitted on the advent of the Vichy regime, which allowed free and unrestrained expression of racial hatred.

Another social consequence was the enhanced role of the press. For the first time it exerted an important influence on French political life. It was possible to speak of a fourth estate since it could act the part of all state organs. Especially as the high editorial quality of the press was mainly derived from the work of writers and novelists who used newspapers as a revolutionary way of expression. The power of the press certainly brought politicians to action, an example of which was Mercier, who appeared to have pushed at the Dreyfus trial in 1894 to please La Libre Parole who attacked ferociously. This being said the role of the press was limited by the size of circulation, influential in Paris but to a lesser extent nationwide. The entire run of the national press appeared to revolve around four and a half million copies whose real influence was relatively strong. There was also assistance through the publication in 1899 of a specific newspaper intended to coordinate the fight (in the dreyfusard camp), with the People's Daily of Sébastien Faure.

=== Zionism ===
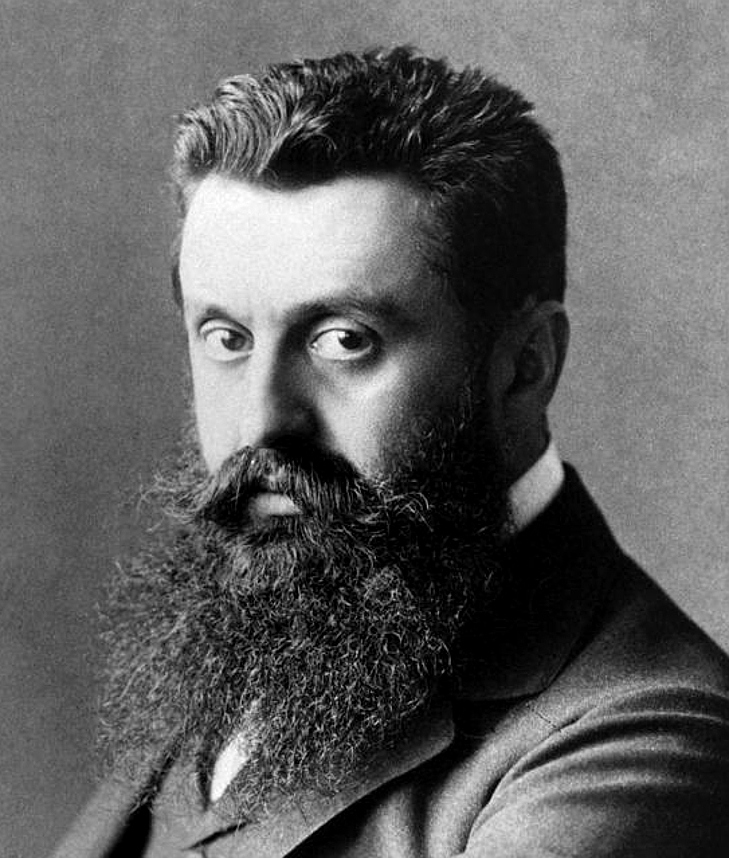
Theodor Herzl created the Zionist Congress after the Dreyfus affair.

The Austro-Hungarian journalist Theodor Herzl appeared profoundly moved by the Dreyfus affair, which followed his debut as a correspondent for the Neue Freie Presse of Vienna and was present at the degradation of Dreyfus in 1895. "The catalyst for Herzl's 'conversion' is usually seen as the Dreyfus affair, which made him realise the impossibility of Jewish existence in Europe", although some scholars believe that Herzl may have exaggerated the influence that the Dreyfus affair had on him. Before the wave of antisemitism that accompanied the degradation Herzl was "convinced of the need to resolve the Jewish question", which became "an obsession for him". In Der Judenstaat ("State of the Jews"), he considered that:

[I]f France – bastion of emancipation, progress and universal socialism – [can] get caught up in a maelstrom of antisemitism and let the Parisian crowd chant 'Kill the Jews!' Where can they be safe once again – if not in their own country? Assimilation does not solve the problem because the Gentile world will not allow it as the Dreyfus affair has so clearly demonstrated.

Herzl's shock was great, for, having lived his youth in Austria, an antisemitic country, he chose to live in France for its humanist image, which made it appear a shelter from extremist excess. He had originally been a fanatic supporter for assimilation of Jews into European Gentile society. The Dreyfus affair shook Herzl's view on the world, and he became completely enveloped in a tiny movement calling for the restoration of a Jewish State within the biblical homeland in the Land of Israel. Herzl quickly took charge in leading the movement.

He organized the First Zionist Congress in Basel on 29 August 1897, and is considered the "inventor of Zionism as a real political movement". Herzl wrote in his diary (1 September 1897):

Were I to sum up the Basel Congress in a word – which I shall guard against pronouncing publicly – it would be this: At Basel I founded the Jewish State. If I said this out loud today, I would be answered by universal laughter. Perhaps in five years, and certainly in fifty, everyone will recognize this.

The Dreyfus affair also marked a turning point in the lives of many Jews from Western and Central Europe, as the pogroms of 1881–1882 had done for the Jews of Eastern Europe, as many Jews had believed that they were Frenchmen first. Yet Jews, despite the state-sanctioned efforts of the emancipation movement, were never truly accepted into society and were often deemed aliens and outsiders, even when they showed extreme devotion by fighting courageously in the wars of their respective countries.

=== 21st-century aftermath ===
In October 2021, French President Emmanuel Macron opened a museum dedicated to the Dreyfus affair in Zola's former home in Médan in the northwestern suburbs of Paris. He said that nothing could repair the humiliations and injustices Dreyfus had suffered, and "let us not aggravate it by forgetting, deepening or repeating them". In June 2025, the French parliament approved a bill to promote Dreyfus to the rank of brigadier general.

The statements followed attempts by the French far right to question Dreyfus's innocence. An army colonel was cashiered in 1994 for publishing an article suggesting that Dreyfus was guilty; far-right politician Jean-Marie Le Pen's lawyer responded that Dreyfus's exoneration was "contrary to all known jurisprudence". Éric Zemmour, a far-right political opponent of Macron who had said that France's Second World War collaborationist leader Philippe Pétain, who had assisted deportation of French Jews to Nazi death camps, had, in certain cases, saved their lives, said repeatedly in 2021 that the truth about Dreyfus was not clear, his innocence was "not obvious."

Though Alfred Dreyfus was eventually exonerated of all charges, the scandal and its aftermath had lasting repercussions in French society. In the 20th and 21st century, the Dreyfus affair was an important part of French history and has been the focus of much public debate. The controversy has been used to frame discussion on issues such as immigration, religious freedom, minority rights, and the French Republic itself. In recent years, the Dreyfus affair has also been used to draw attention to the resurgence of antisemitism in Europe, and to advocate for legislation that would protect minority rights across the continent. French lawmakers have proposed a number of bills that would extend protections to minority communities, such as prohibiting discrimination based on ethnicity or religion, and providing additional resources for victims of hate crimes.

== Other related events ==
=== Commission of sculpture ===
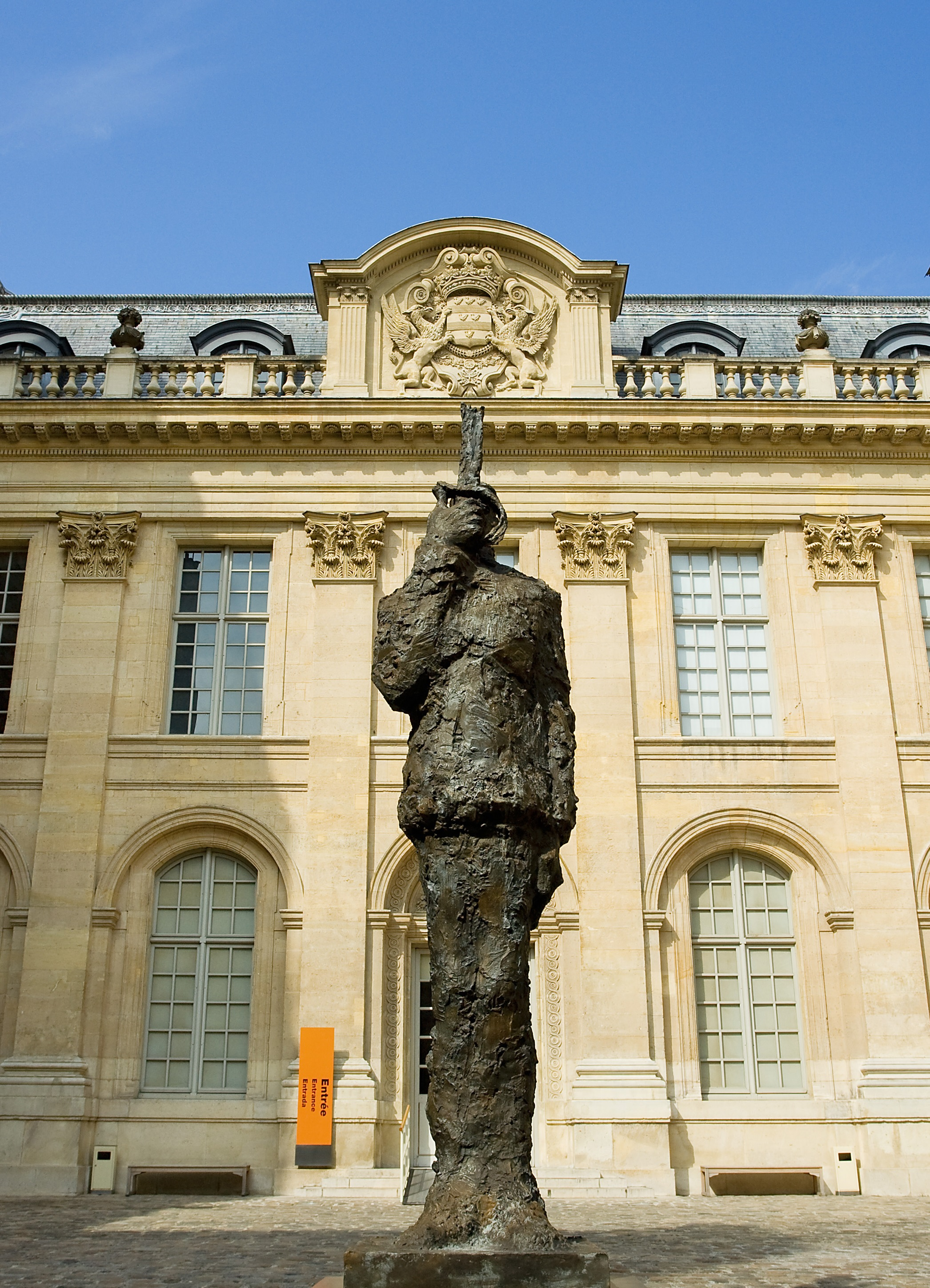
The statue of Captain Dreyfus in the courtyard of the Hôtel de Saint-Aignan, home of the Musée d'Art et d'Histoire du Judaïsme

In 1985, President François Mitterrand commissioned a statue of Dreyfus by sculptor Louis Mitelberg. It was to be installed at the École Militaire but the Minister of Defense Charles Hernu refused to display it there. Hernu claimed that this was because the École Militaire is not open to the public, but it was widely believed that this was done to avoid provoking the army. Mitterrand did not override his minister and the statue was instead installed at Boulevard Raspail, No. 116–118 at the exit of the Notre-Dame-des-Champs metro station, where it can be found today. A replica is located at the entrance of Paris's Museum of Jewish Art and History, which houses the Fonds Alfred Dreyfus of over 2500 historical documents donated by the grandchildren of Captain Dreyfus.

=== Centennial commemoration ===
On 12 July 2006, President Jacques Chirac held an official state ceremony marking the centenary of Dreyfus's official rehabilitation. This was held in the presence of the living descendants of both Émile Zola and Alfred Dreyfus. The event took place in the same cobblestone courtyard of Paris's École Militaire where Capitaine Dreyfus had been officially stripped of his officer's rank. Chirac stated that "the combat against the dark forces of intolerance and hate is never definitively won", and called Dreyfus "an exemplary officer" and a "patriot who passionately loved France". The French National Assembly also held a memorial ceremony of the centennial marking the end of the affair. This was held in remembrance of the 1906 laws that had reintegrated and promoted both Dreyfus and Picquart at the end of the Dreyfus affair.

=== Annual commemoration day ===
In 2025, President Emmanuel Macron declared July 12 as an annual day of commemoration for Dreyfus. Pending approval by the French senate, the first date of observance will be 2026, recognizing the 120th anniversary of France's high court clearing Dreyfus of charges and affirming his innocence.

== Historiography of the Dreyfus affair ==
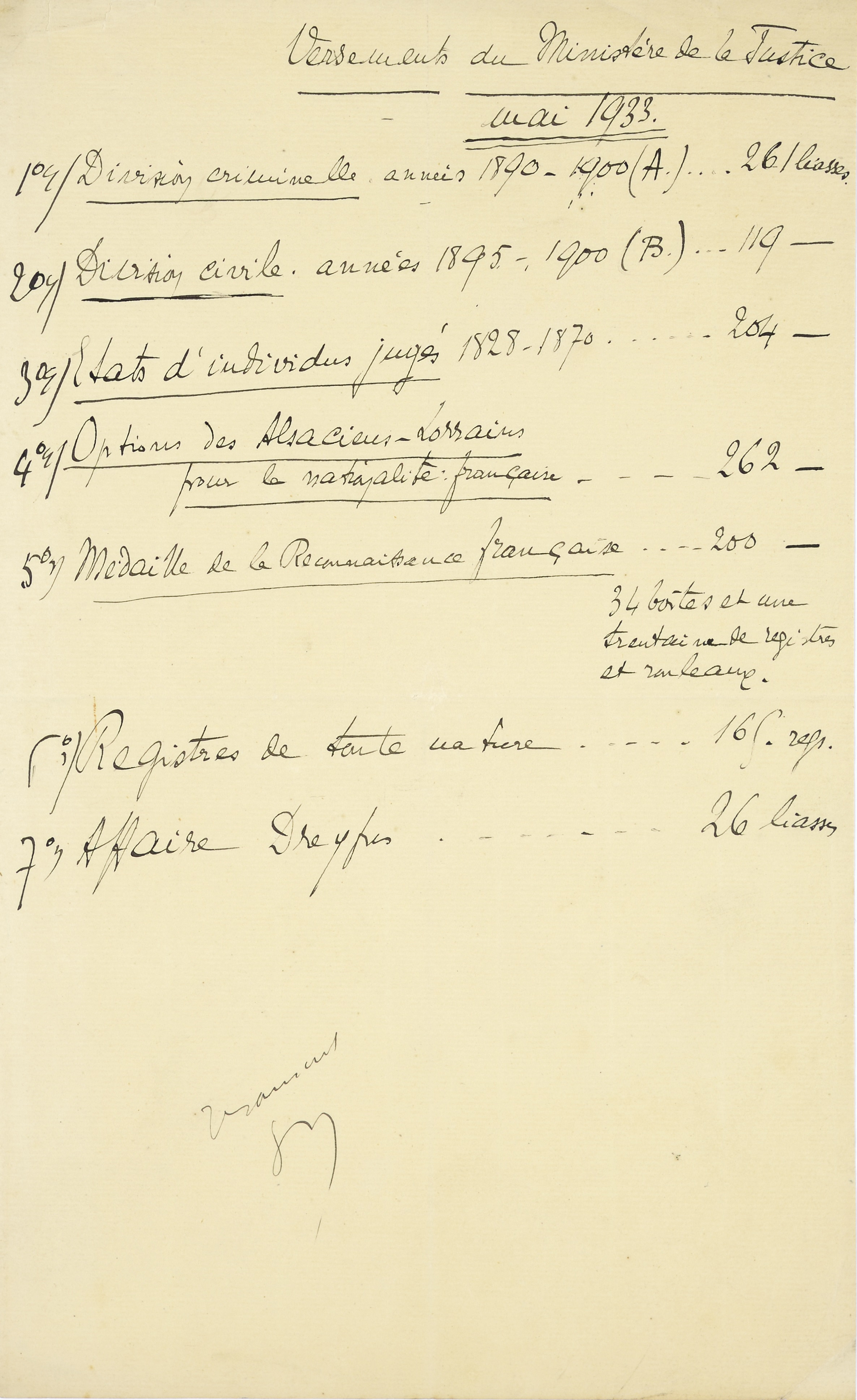
List of documents in the French National Archives related to the Dreyfus affair and given by the ministry of Justice

The Dreyfus affair is distinguished by the large number of books published on this subject.

The contemporary literature of the case was published between 1894 and 1906. It began with the pamphlet of Bernard Lazare, the first intellectual Dreyfusard.

The Precis of the Dreyfus Affair by "Henri-Dutrait Crozon", a pseudonym of Colonel Larpent, is the basis of all anti-Dreyfusard literature after the affair to the present time. The author develops the theory of conspiracy, fueled by Jewish finance, to push Esterhazy to accuse himself of crime. Under a scientific exterior there will be found there an elaboration of theories without evidence or support.

The publication of notes by Schwartzkoppen in 1930 shed light on the guilty role of Esterházy in the affair and exonerated Alfred Dreyfus at the same time, if such vindication was needed. The extreme right questioned the value of this testimony but most historians hold it to be a valid source despite some ambiguities and inaccuracies.

The period of the occupation throws a veil over the case. The liberation and the revelation of the Holocaust brought a deep reflection on all of the Dreyfus affair. Jacques Kayser (1946) then Maurice Paléologue (1955) and Henri Giscard d'Estaing (1960) revived the case without great revelations, a process generally considered insufficient historically.

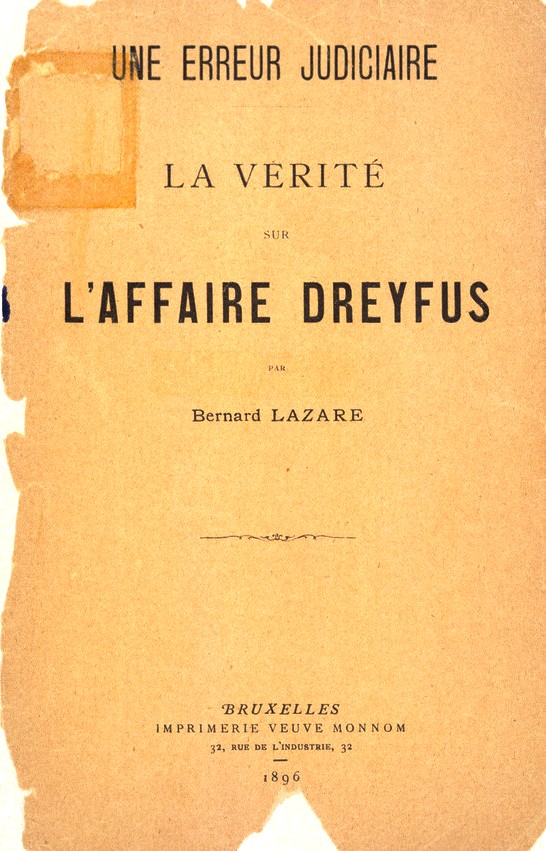
First brochure of A Miscarriage of Justice, Bernard Lazare published in 1896 in Brussels

Marcel Thomas, chief curator at the National Archives, in 1961 provided through his The Affair Without Dreyfus in two volumes a complete review of the history of the affair supported by all available public and private archives. His work is the foundation of all subsequent historical studies.

Reflecting the intense interest in social history that gripped historians since the 1960s and 1970s, Eric Cahm wrote The Dreyfus Affair in French Society and Politics (1996), an analysis of the sociology of the affair. Michael Burns, Rural Society and French Politics, Boulangism and the Dreyfus Affair, 1886–1900 (1984) does the same in a more limited fashion. Vincent Duclert's Biography of Alfred Dreyfus (2005) includes, in 1300 pages, the complete correspondence of Alfred and Lucie Dreyfus from 1894 to 1899.

Early writers marginalized the role of antisemitism. However since the publication of Jean-Denis Bredin, The Affair: The Case of Alfred Dreyfus (1986) and Stephen Wilson, Ideology and Experience: Antisemitism in France at the Time of the Dreyfus Affair (1982), more attention has been paid to the undercurrent of antisemitism in French society and its effect on the evolution of the case.

In 1983, the lawyer and historian Jean-Denis Bredin published L'Affair (The Affair). The interest of the book focuses on a strictly factual relating of the story with documented facts and multifaceted reflection on the different aspects of the event. The book also revealed for the first time the existence of homosexual correspondence in the prosecution case. Expanding on a 2008 article they published in la Revue d'histoire moderne et contemporaine, in 2012 the historians Pierre Gervais, Pauline Peretz and Pierre Stutin published Le dossier secret de l'affaire Dreyfus (The Secret Record of the Dreyfus Affair). Their research enabled the original contents of the secret file to be established. Their thesis was that historians had neglected the correspondence of Schwartzkoppen and Panizzardi, and that homosexuality played a central role in the slandering of Dreyfus.

== In literature ==
The Dreyfus affair provided the basis for many novels. The last work of Émile Zola (1902), Truth, transposes the Dreyfus affair to the world of education. Anatole France published The Island of Penguins (1907), which recounts the affair in Book VI: "The Case of 80,000 bundles of hay". Franz Kafka's short story "In the Penal Colony" drew inspiration from Devil's Island and the debate about justice and punishment the Dreyfus affair provoked in French society. Marcel Proust devoted significant passages of his second, third and fourth volumes of In Search of Lost Time to Parisian society's reaction to the Dreyfus affair. Other authors have also contributed, such as Roger Martin du Gard and Maurice Barrès.

The 2013 novel An Officer and a Spy by Robert Harris, and Roman Polanski's 2019 French-language film J'accuse (aka An Officer and a Spy), adapted by Polanski and Harris from the novel, tell the story of the Dreyfus affair from Picquart's perspective.

== See also ==
- Beilis affair
- Hilsner affair
- Leo Frank affair
- Human Rights League (France)
- The Dreyfus Affair (film series), an 1899 series of short silent docudramas
- Musée d'Art et d'Histoire du Judaïsme
- Henry Ossian Flipper
- Bibliography of the Dreyfus Affair

== Sources ==
=== Primary sources ===
- 1898 (in French) Verbatim record of the trial of Emile Zola in the Assizes of the Seine and the Supreme Court.
- 1898 (in French) Enquiry of the Supreme Court (1898–1899).
- 1898 (in French) Proceedings of the Supreme Court for the revision of the Dreyfus trial.
- 1899 (in French) Verbatim record of the proceedings of Rennes Volume 1, Volume 2, Volume 3
- 1904 (in French) Memoire of Alfred Dreyfus to the Supreme Court.
- 1904 (in French) Enquiry of the Supreme Court.
- 1906 (in French) Debates of the Supreme Court.
- 1906 (in French) Decision of the Supreme Court for the verdict of the Dreyfus trial without reference to 1899.
- 2013 (in English) The Secret File, posted online by Ministry of Defence 6 March 2013 and transcription

=== Reference bibliography ===
- 1901 (in French) Joseph Reinach, History of the Dreyfus Affair, Fasquelle, 1901–1911; éd. Robert Laffont, two vol., 2006 231.
- 1961 (in French) Marcel Thomas, The Affair Without Dreyfus, Fayard – Idégraf (Geneva), 1961–1979 – 2 volumes.
- 1981 (in French) Jean-Denis Bredin, The Affair, Fayard, Paris, 1993 (1ère édition 1981) (ISBN 2-260-00346-X).
- 1986 (in English) Jean-Denis Bredin, The Affair: The Case of Alfred Dreyfus, George Braziller, New York, ISBN 0-8076-1175-1 Plunkett Lake Press Ebooks
- 2005 (in French) Vincent Duclert, Biography of Alfred Dreyfus: The Honour of a Patriot, Fayard, Paris, 2006 (ISBN 2213627959).

=== Other general works ===
- McMillan, James F. Twentieth-Century France: Politics and Society in France 1898–1991 (1992) pp. 3–12
- Sowerwine, Charles. France since 1870: Culture, Society and the Making of the Republic (2001) excerpt and text search pp. 67–72
- 1984 (in English) Michael Burns, Rural Society and French Politics, Boulangism and the Dreyfus Affair, 1886–1900 Princeton University Press.
- 1991 (in English) Alfred S. Lindemann, The Jew Accused: Three Anti-Semitic Affairs, Dreyfus, Beilis, Frank, 1894–1914 (Cambridge University Press).
- 1992 (in English) Michael Burns, Dreyfus: A Family Affair, from the French Revolution to the Holocaust, New York: Harper.
- 1998 (in English) Michael Burns, France and the Dreyfus Affair: A Documentary History (Boston: Bedford/St. Martin's)
- 1996 (in English) Eric Cahm, The Dreyfus Affair in French Society and Politics New York: Longman
- 1999 (in English) Martin P. Johnson, The Dreyfus Affair: Honour and Politics in the Belle Epoque (New York: Palgrave Macmillan).
- 2006 (in English) George R. Whyte, The Accused: The Dreyfus Trilogy, Inter Nationes, ISBN 3-929979-28-4
- 2006 (in English) George R. Whyte, The Dreyfus Affair: a Chronological History, Palgrave Macmillan 2006, ISBN 978-0-230-20285-6
- 2007 (in English) Ruth Harris, The Assumptionists and the Dreyfus Affair, Past & Present (2007) 194#1 175–211. in Project MUSE
- 2010 (in English) Ruth Harris, Dreyfus: Politics, Emotion, and the Scandal of the Century (Henry Holt and Company) online
- 2008 (in French) Philippe Oriol, History of the Dreyfus Affair – Vol 1 – The History of Captain Dreyfus, Stock, (ISBN 978-2-234-06080-7)
- 2009 (in English) Louis Begley, Why the Dreyfus Affair Matters (Yale University Press)
- 2010 (in English) Frederick Brown, For the Soul of France: Culture Wars in the Age of Dreyfus (Alfred A. Knopf)
- 2012 (in English) Robert L. Fuller, The Origins of the French Nationalist Movement, 1886–1914, Jefferson, NC: McFarland.
- 2012 (in English) Piers Paul Read, The Dreyfus Affair, Bloomsbury, London
- 2024 (in English) Maurice Samuels, Alfred Dreyfus: The Man at the Center of the Affair (Yale University Press)

=== In French ===
- 1961 (in French) Pierre Miquel, The Dreyfus Affair, University of France Press – PUF – coll. "What do I know?", réprinted 2003 (ISBN 2130532268)
- 1989 (in French) Pierre Miquel, The Third Republic, Fayard
- 1986 (in French) Michel Winock, The Fever of France: The Great Political Crises. 1871–1968, Points Seuil, (ISBN 2020098318)
- 1999 (in French) Michel Winock, The School of Intellectuals, Le Seuil, coll. Points
- 1994 (in French) Pierre Birnbaum, The Dreyfus Affair: The Republic in Peril, Gallimard, coll. "Discoveries", (ISBN 978-2070532773).
- 1994 (in French) Pierre Birnbaum, The France of the Dreyfus Affair, Gallimard, Paris
- 1998 (in French) Pierre Birnbaum, Was the French Army Antisemitic?, pp. 70–82 in Michel Winock: The Dreyfus Affair, Editions du Seuil, Paris, ISBN 2-02-032848-8
- 1994 (in French) Michael Burns, Histoire d'une famille française, les Dreyfus, Fayard, 1994 (ISBN 978-2213031323)
- 1994 (in French) Éric Cahm, The Dreyfus Affair, Päperback, coll. "references"
- 1994 (in French) Michel Drouin (dir.), The Dreyfus Affair Dictionary, Flammarion, reprinted 2006 (ISBN 2082105474).
- 1994 (in French) Vincent Duclert, The Dreyfus Affair, The Discovery, reprinted 2006 (ISBN 2707147931).
- 2006 (in French) Vincent Duclert, Dreyfus is Innocent: History of an Affair of State, Larousse, (ISBN 203582639X)
- 2006 (in French) Vincent Duclert, Alfred Dreyfus, Librairie Artheme Fayard, ISBN 2-213-62795-9
- 2010 (in French) Vincent Duclert, The Dreyfus Affair: When Justice Enlightens the Republic, Private
- 2000 (in French) Francis Démier, The France of the Nineteenth Century, Seuil, coll. "Points in History".
- 2006 (in French) Méhana Mouhou, Dreyfus Affair: Conspiracy in the Republic, Éd. L'Harmattan.
- 2012 (in French) Pierre Gervais, Pauline Peretz et Pierre Stutin, The Secret File of the Dreyfus Affair, Alma editor, (ISBN 978-2362790430)

=== Specialised works ===
- 1960 (in French) Patrice Boussel, The Dreyfus Affair and the Press, Armand Colin, coll. "Kiosk", 272 pp.
- 1962 (in French) Henri Guillemin, The Esterházy Enigma, Gallimard
- 1994 (in French) Jean Doise, A Secret Well Guarded: Military History of the Dreyfus Affair, Le Seuil, 225 pp. (ISBN 2-02-021100-9)
- 1998 (in French) Philippe-E. Landau, Jewish Opinion and the Dreyfus Affair, Albin Michel, "The Presence of Judaism", paperback
- 2000 (in French) Armand Israël, The Hidden Truth of the Dreyfus Affair, Albin Michel, (ISBN 2-226-11123-9)
- 2000 (in French) Collective, Intellectuals Face the Dreyfus Affair, Then and Now, L'Harmattan, (ISBN 978-2738460257)
- 2004 (in French) Général André Bach, The Army of Dreyfus. A political history of the French army from Charles X to "The Affair", Tallandier, (ISBN 2-84734-039-4)
- 2006 (in French) Thierry Lévy, Jean-Pierre Royer, Labori, a lawyer, Louis Audibert Éditions, (ISBN 2-226-11123-9)
- 2006 (in French) Supreme Court, collective, Justice in the Dreyfus Affair, Fayard, (ISBN 978-2213629520)
- 2006 (in French) Pierre Touzin et Francois Vauvillier, Guns of Victory 1914–1918, Volume 1, The Artillery of the campaign. History and Collections, Paris. ISBN 2-35250-022-2
- 2010 (in French) Georges Joumas, Echos of the Dreyfus Affair for an Orléanais, Corsaire Éditions, (ISBN 978-2-910475-12-3)
- 2013 (in English) Leila Schneps and Coralie Colmez, Math on trial. How numbers get used and abused in the courtroom, Basic Books, 2013. ISBN 978-0-465-03292-1. (Chapter 10: "Math error number 10: mathematical madness. The Dreyfus affair: spy or scapegoat?").

=== Anti-Dreyfusard works ===
- 1909 (in French) Henri Dutrait-Crozon, Précis of the Dreyfus Affair, Paris, New National Library, First Editionmière, Final Edition 1924.

=== Articles and newspapers ===
- 1978 (in French) Dreyfusards!: Memories from Mathieu Dreyfus and other novelties (presented by Robert Gauthier). Gallimard & Julliard, coll. Archives No. 16, Paris
- 1988 (in French) Max Guermann, "The terrible truth", Revue Les Cahiers Naturalistes, No. 62.
- 1994 (in French) Revue in L'Histoire n o 173, Spécial Dreyfus, January 1994
- 2005 (in French) Special edition of Le Figaro on 12 July 2005, The centenary of the rehabilitation of Captain Dreyfus
- 2006 (in English) Kim Willsher (27 June 2006), "Calls for Dreyfus to be buried in Panthéon", The Guardian
- 2006 (in English) Ronald Schechter (7 July 2006), "The Ghosts of Alfred Dreyfus", The Forward.
- 2006 (in English) Stanley Meisler (9 July 2006), "Not just a Jew in a French jail", Los Angeles Times
- 2006 (in English) Adam Kirsch (11 July 2006), "The Most Shameful of Stains", The New York Sun
- 2007 (in French) Thomas Loué, "The Dreyfus Affair", in L. Boltanski et alii éds., Affairs, scandals, and great causes, Paris, Stock, pp. 213–227
- 2012 (in English) Schultheiss, Katrin. "The Dreyfus Affair and History", Journal of The Historical Society, 12 189–203. doi:10.1111/j.1540-5923.2012.00362.x

=== Testimonials ===
- 1898 (in French) Jean Jaurès, The Evidence, Collection of Articles appearing in La Petite République – available on Wikisource
- 1898 (in French) Alfred Dreyfus, Letters of an Innocent man, Stock
- 1901 (in English) Alfred Dreyfus, Five Years of My Life, French original "Cinq années de ma vie" published in France in 1901, English translation first published in 1901, newest reprint 2019 (ISBN 978-3-945831-19-9).
- 1901 (in French) Alfred Dreyfus, Cinq années de ma vie, Eugène Fasquelle Éditeurs, Paris, 1901, reprinted 2006 (The Discovery) (ISBN 2707148067)
- 1898 (in French) Paschal Grousset, The Dreyfus Affair and its secret remits: a historical summary, ed Godet et Cie, Paris, 240 p.
- 1899 (in French) Paschal Grousset, The Dreyfus Affair, the word of an enigma. Paris, Stock.
- 1899 (in French) Georges Clemenceau, Towards Reparation, Tresse & Stock
- 1899 (in French) Georges Clemenceau, The Iniquity, Stock
- 1903 (in French) Georges Clemenceau, The Disgrace
- 1955 (in French) Maurice Paléologue, The Dreyfus Affair and the Quai d'Orsay, Plon
- 1957 (in English) Maurice Paléologue, My Secret Diary of the Dreyfus Case 1894–1899, Secker & Warburg.
- 1978 (in French) Mathieu Dreyfus, The Affair that I have lived, Bernard Grasset, Paris. (ISBN 2-246-00668-6)
- 1991 (in French) Octave Mirbeau, The Dreyfus Affair, Librairie Séguier.
- 1993 (in French) Léon Blum, Memories of The Affair, Flammarion, Folio Histoire, (ISBN 978-2070327522)
- 2006 (in French) Émile Zola, Fight for Dreyfus. Preface by Martine Le Blond-Zola. Postscript by Jean-Louis Lévy. Presentation and notes d'Alain Pagès. Dilecta Edition.
