= Dreyfus (1930 film) =

1930 film directed by Richard Oswald

- Directed by: Richard Oswald
- Written by: Heinz Goldberg; Fritz Wendhausen
- Based on: Der Prozess des Hauptmanns Dreyfus by Bruno Weil
- Produced by: Richard Oswald
- Starring: Fritz Kortner; Grete Mosheim; Heinrich George; Oskar Homolka
- Cinematography: Heinrich Balasch; Friedl Behn-Grund
- Edited by: Max Brenner; Jean Oser
- Production company: Richard-Oswald-Produktion
- Distributed by: Süd-Film
- Release date: 16 August 1930
- Running time: 115 minutes
- Country: Germany
- Language: German

Dreyfus is a 1930 German drama film directed by Richard Oswald and starring Fritz Kortner, Grete Mosheim, and Heinrich George. It portrays the Dreyfus affair and is based on a novel by Bruno Weil. The film's sets were designed by the art directors Franz Schroedter and Hermann Warm. It premiered at the Gloria-Palast in Berlin. In the United States the film was released under the alternative title The Dreyfus Case.

The film was remade the following year in Britain with Cedric Hardwicke in the title role.

== Synopsis ==
In the late nineteenth century Alfred Dreyfus, a French army officer of Jewish heritage, is falsely accused of espionage for Germany. Found guilty of treason he is drummed out of the army and sent to prison on Devil's Island in French Guiana. His family take up the case of the wronged officer, as does the writer Emile Zola who believes the original investigation was marred by anti-Semitism. Eventually, the true culprit Ferdinand Walsin Esterhazy is exposed.

== Cast ==
- Fritz Kortner as Alfred Dreyfus
- Grete Mosheim as Lucie Dreyfus
- Erwin Kalser as Mathieu Dreyfus (brother of the accused)
- Heinrich George as Émile Zola
- Albert Bassermann as Col. Picquart
- Oskar Homolka as Maj. Ferdinand Walsin Esterhazy
- Nora Mestom as Marguerite Pays (his girlfriend)
- Ferdinand Hart as Maj. Henry
- Fritz Rasp as Maj. Du Paty de Clam
- Paul Bildt as Georges Clemenceau
- Fritz Kampers as Labori (defense counsel)
- Paul Henckels as Edgar Demange (defense counsel)
- Ferdinand Bonn as Gen. Mercier
- Leopold von Ledebur as Gen. De Boisdeffre
- Bernhard Goetzke as Gen. Pellieux
- Fritz Alberti as Godefroy Cavaignac
- Eduard Rothauser as Capt. Lauth
- Josef Reithofer as Maj. Forzinetti (prison governor)
- Bruno Ziener as Alphonse Bertillon
- Sigmund Nunberg as Chairman of the Jury Court
- Elsa Bassermann as Parisian lady
- Fritz Reiff as Jean Jaurès
- Bernd Aldor as Dubois
- Ferry von Gorup as Officer in military prison, Cherche-Midi

== Bibliography ==
- Prawer, Siegbert Salomon (2005). Between Two Worlds: The Jewish Presence in German and Austrian Film, 1910–1933. New York: Berghahn Books. ISBN 978-1-84545-074-8.
