= I Accuse! =

1958 film by José Ferrer

- Directed by: José Ferrer
- Screenplay by: Gore Vidal
- Based on: Captain Dreyfus; The Story of a Mass Hysteria (1955 book) by Nicholas Halasz
- Produced by: Sam Zimbalist
- Starring: José Ferrer; Anton Walbrook; Viveca Lindfors; Leo Genn; Emlyn Williams; David Farrar; Donald Wolfit; Herbert Lom
- Cinematography: Freddie Young
- Edited by: Frank Clarke
- Music by: William Alwyn
- Production company: MGM-British Studios
- Distributed by: Metro-Goldwyn-Mayer
- Release dates: 18 February 1958 (Cape Town premiere); 15 February 1959 (UK)
- Running time: 99 minutes
- Country: United Kingdom
- Language: English
- Budget: $1.8 million
- Box office: $665,000

I Accuse! is a 1958 British biographical historical drama film based on the Dreyfus affair, in which a Jewish captain in the French Army, Alfred Dreyfus, was falsely accused of treason and imprisoned for five years before being pardoned. The film is directed by and stars José Ferrer in the leading role, with Anton Walbrook (in his final film role), Viveca Lindfors, Leo Genn, Emlyn Williams, David Farrar, Donald Wolfit, and Herbert Lom. The screenplay, written by Gore Vidal, on Nicholas Halasz’s 1955 account Captain Dreyfus; The Story of a Mass Hysteria.

== Plot ==
In 1894, Alfred Dreyfus, a Jewish captain in the French Army, is falsely accused of selling military secrets to the Germans. He is charged with treason and, despite weak evidence against him, is convicted after being railroaded by the military court. He is sentenced to life imprisonment on Devil's Island while the real spy, Major Ferdinand Walsin Esterhazy, helps in the investigation.

When Esterhazy is found to be the real mole, the French Army tries to hide the truth by exonerating the traitor in a mock trial. Émile Zola writes an open letter to the prime minister of France entitled J'Accuse...! ("I Accuse...!"), which reveals the truth behind the cover up. The letter is published in the newspaper, causing a firestorm around the world, leading to a re-examination of the entire Dreyfus case.

Eventually, Esterhazy makes a full confession, and Dreyfus is completely exonerated, being reinstated to the army and inducted into the French Legion of Honor.

== Cast ==
- José Ferrer as Captain Alfred Dreyfus
- Anton Walbrook as Major Ferdinand Walsin Esterhazy
- Viveca Lindfors as Lucie Dreyfus
- Leo Genn as Major Piquart
- Emlyn Williams as Émile Zola
- David Farrar as Mathieu Dreyfus
- Donald Wolfit as General Mercier
- Herbert Lom as Major DuPaty de Clam
- Harry Andrews as Major Henry
- Felix Aylmer as Edgar Demange
- George Coulouris as Colonel Sandherr
- Peter Illing as Georges Clemenceau
- Michael Hordern as Prosecutor
- Laurence Naismith as Judge
- Ernest Clark as Prosecutor
- Eric Pohlmann as Bertillon
- John Phillips as Prosecutor, Esterhazy trial
- Malcolm Keen as President of France
- Charles Gray as Captain Brossard
- Moultrie Kelsall as Auguste Scheurer-Kestner

== Production ==
The film was based on a book Captain Dreyfus: Story of Mass Hysteria which was published in 1955. In October 1955 MGM acquired an option on the film rights. The story had been filmed previously, notably in The Life of Émile Zola, but MGM claimed the book "contains quite a bit of material that had not come to life before".

The film was known as Captain Dreyfus before being retitled I Accuse.

Due to the film's unflattering portrayal of the French military, the government refused to allow filming in Paris. Instead, the film was shot on-location in Belgium, West Germany, and MGM-British Studios in Borehamwood, England. Filming finished by June 1957.

== Release ==
The film premiered in Cape Town, South Africa on 18 February 1958. It went into general release in the United States on 5 March 1958, and in the United Kingdom on 15 February 1959.

I Accuse! was a box office flop. It earned $190,000 in the US and Canada and $475,000 elsewhere, leading to a loss of $1,415,000.

== Reception ==
Variety called the film "strong, if plodding, entertainment." The publication said Ferrer's performance is "a wily, impeccable one, but it comes from the intellect rather than the heart and rarely causes pity."

The Philadelphia Inquirer was unimpressed: "For no immediately apparent reason, the Dreyfus scandal...is being given a new screen airing....more zeal than art....Gore Vidal's plodding writing is almost constantly at odds with the overly melodramatic or numbed performances director-star Ferrer has elicited from himself and his cast....If Ferrer underplays drastically, the reverse must be said for almost everyone else in the large, hard-pressed cast."

New York Times critic Bosley Crowther wrote that the film's "studious and generally valid re-enactment of the highlights of the case offers rewards," but said the film lacked excitement and drama and that "Mr. Ferrer's Dreyfus is a sad sack, a silent and colorless man who takes his unjust conviction with but one outburst of protest and then endures his Devil's Island torment lying down. He is a chilly hero who stirs mere intellectual sympathy."
