= Dreyfus (1931 film) =

1931 British film by F.W. Kraemer and Milton Rosmer

- American poster
- Directed by: F.W. Kraemer; Milton Rosmer
- Written by: Reginald Berkeley and Walter C. Mycroft (writers); Wilhelm Herzog and Hans Rehfisch (play)
- Produced by: F.W. Kraemer
- Starring: Cedric Hardwicke; Abraham Sofaer; George Zucco; Arthur Hardy
- Cinematography: Walter J. Harvey; Horace Wheddon; Willy Winterstein
- Edited by: Langford Reed; Betty Spiers
- Music by: John Reynders
- Production company: British International Pictures
- Distributed by: Wardour Films; Columbia Pictures (US)
- Release date: 20 April 1931
- Running time: 90 minutes
- Country: United Kingdom
- Language: English

Dreyfus is a 1931 British film directed by F.W. Kraemer and Milton Rosmer and starring Cedric Hardwicke and Charles Carson. It was translated from the play by Wilhelm Herzog and Hans Rehfisch, and the 1930 German film Dreyfus. It features George Zucco in his film debut.

== Cast ==
- Cedric Hardwicke as Capt. Alfred Dreyfus
- Charles Carson as Col. Picquart
- George Merritt as Émile Zola
- Sam Livesey as Labori
- Beatrix Thomson as Lucille Dreyfus
- Garry Marsh as Maj. Esterhazy
- Randle Ayrton as Court-martial president
- Henry Caine as Col. Hubert-Joseph Henry
- Reginald Dance as President, Zola trial
- George Skillan as Maj. Armand du Paty de Clam
- Leonard Shepherd as Georges Clemenceau
- Arthur Hardy as Gen. Auguste Mercier
- Alexander Sarner as Mathieu Dreyfus
- Frederick Leister as Edgar Demange
- J. Fisher White as Georges-Gabriel de Pellieux
- Abraham Sofaer as Dubois
- J. Leslie Frith as Alphonse Bertillon
- George Zucco as Jacques Marie Eugène Godefroy Cavaignac

== See also ==
- Dreyfus (1930)
