= Prisoner of Honor =

- VHS Art cover
- Genre: Biography; Drama
- Written by: Ron Hutchinson
- Directed by: Ken Russell
- Starring: Richard Dreyfuss; Oliver Reed; Peter Firth; Jeremy Kemp; Brian Blessed; Peter Vaughan; Lindsay Anderson; Martin Friend; Kenneth Colley
- Music by: Barry Kirsch
- Country of origin: United Kingdom
- Original language: English

Production
- Producers: Richard Dreyfuss; Judith James
- Cinematography: Mike Southon
- Running time: 88 minutes
- Production companies: Warner Bros. Television; HBO Pictures
- Budget: $5.2 million

Original release
- Network: HBO
- Release: 2 November 1991

Prisoner of Honor is a 1991 British made-for-television drama film directed by Ken Russell and starring Richard Dreyfuss, Oliver Reed and Peter Firth. It was made by Warner Bros. Television and distributed by HBO, and centers on the famous Dreyfus Affair. Richard Dreyfuss co-produced the film with Judith James, from a screenplay by Ron Hutchinson.

== Plot ==
The film documents the events that saw a French Captain, Alfred Dreyfus, sent to Devil's Island for espionage near the end of the 19th century. Colonel Georges Picquart (Richard Dreyfuss) is given the job of justifying Dreyfus' sentence. Instead, he discovers that Dreyfus (Kenneth Colley), a Jew, was merely a convenient scapegoat for the actions of the true culprit, a member of the French General staff. His attempt to right the wrong sees his military career ended and the famous French author, Émile Zola (Martin Friend), found guilty of libel for publishing his 1898 open letter J'Accuse…!.

== Cast ==
Actor	Role
Richard Dreyfuss	Colonel Picquart
Oliver Reed	General de Boisdeffre
Peter Firth	Major Henry
Jeremy Kemp	General de Pellieux
Brian Blessed	General Gonse
Peter Vaughan	General Mercier
Kenneth Colley	Captain Dreyfus
Martin Friend	Émile Zola
Catherine Neilson	Eloise
Lindsay Anderson	War Minister
Imogen Claire	Cabaret Singer

== Production ==
Richard Dreyfuss stated in an interview that at one time, and before making Prisoner of Honour, he thought he was related by blood to Captain Alfred Dreyfus.

The movie was a passion project for Dreyfuss who had wanted to make it since he was a teenager. He was an admirer of The Life of Emile Zola and J'accuse!. He was unable to get the studios interested - "When you go to a studio, what they need for their agenda that year usually is not a film about the French Army in 1894," he said - but succeeded in setting up the film at HBO. It was the actor's first TV appearance since Victory at Entebbe.

"I've been aware of it because of my name my whole life," said Dreyfuss. "My family is of two minds about kinship. I've always thought we were related. But it doesn't matter, because I created the kinship in my mind as a kid. I thought it was romantic and fun. The Dreyfus Affair was so much a part of what became my political viewpoint, it was too good to deny."

Dreyfuss had been asked to play Dreyfus but "Dreyfus is an offstage character in his own story. He was on Devil's Island the entire time. While what he endured was pretty horrifying, the cultural and political drama occurred without him. What interested me most was the concept of the imperfect hero." Dreyfuss wanted to play Col. Picquart. "His evolution from anti-Semite to defender of Dreyfus was so interesting to me... He simply stepped aside and allowed this change to happen... Picquart was an aristocrat, a Catholic, ambitious and believed in the army," Dreyfuss said. "He thought when he first presented the news about Esterhazy, he would be promoted. He was quite taken aback by their revelation that they preferred him to shut up. He had to do this dance with himself. He believed strongly in the army and his country. He hoped the army could come around. When they finally tried Esterhazy, the trial was a mockery. He was acquitted, and the generals who knew he was guilty shook his hand. Such moral blindness made Picquart feel free to speak out."

Dreyfuss hired Ken Russell to direct. "We wanted a rude director who says to the audience, `Watch this! Come over here! I know this isn't the way you usually see it, but come on over and try it,' " co-producer Judith James said. "You don't want to go lightly into territory like anti-Semitism and government cover-up without really going for it. You want to go into it with courage."

Filming started on 25 February in London.

Russell turned in his second cut of the film without making certain changes the producers asked for. He was then removed from the film.

Russell said "Dreyfuss had the cheek to say, `I know you're very good on music, so I'll send the film back when I've cut it my way and you can supervise the music'. That's a bit like someone asking you to hold your sister down and spray her with perfume while he rapes her."

Dreyfuss took over post production. Russell did decide to leave his name on the film as director.

== Reception ==
The Los Angeles Times called it "one of those movies that looks promising on paper-good cast, interesting director, intriguing story about morality, bigotry and politics-but ends up being considerably slimmer than its topic."

The New York Times said "despite some jagged editing, the film manages to be powerfully convincing in its efforts to foreshadow the prevalent dishonor later found in scandals that would get such shorthand labels as Watergate or Iran-contra."
