= The Life of Emile Zola =

1937 film by William Dieterle

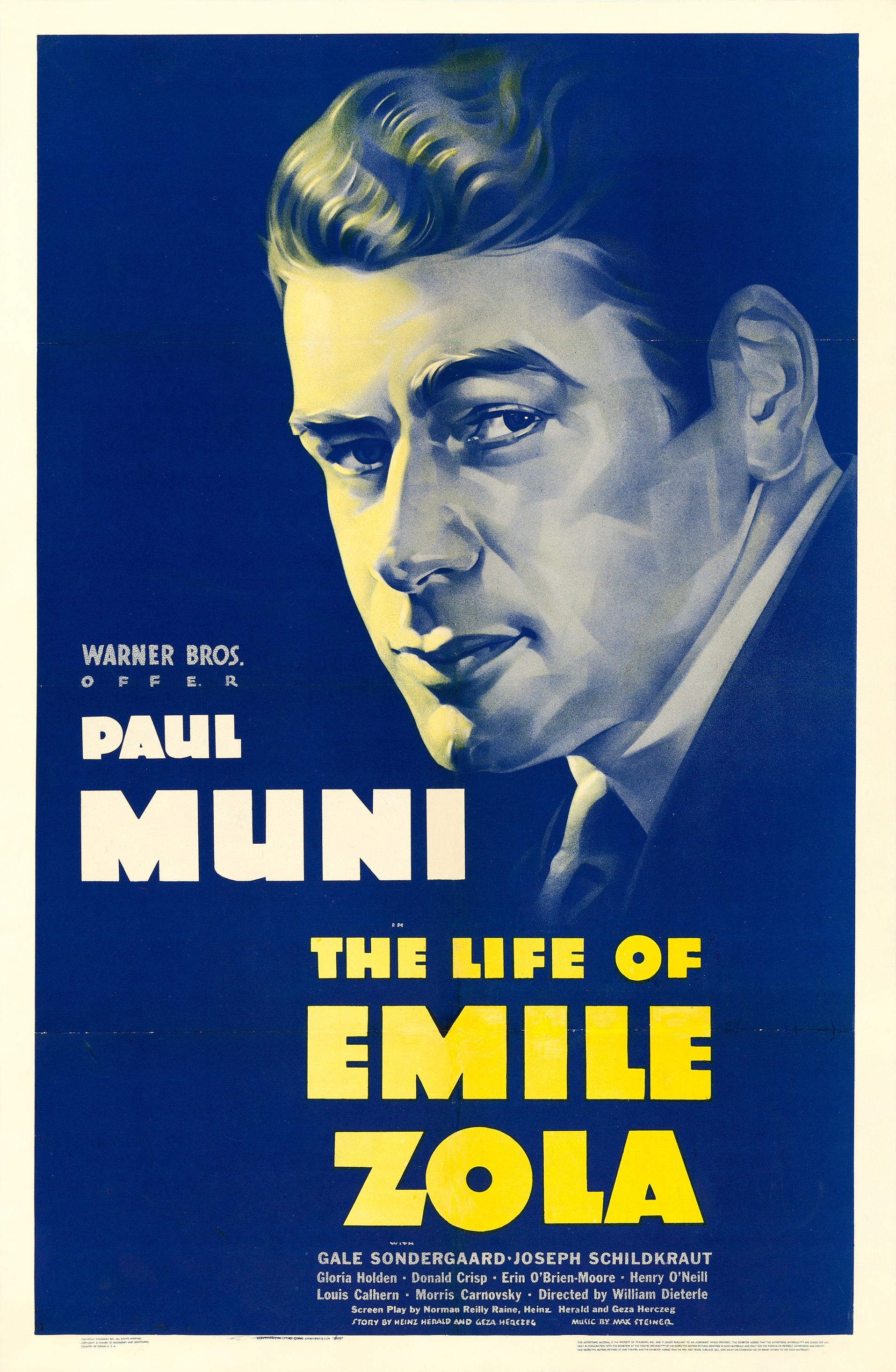
- Theatrical release poster
- Directed by: William Dieterle
- Screenplay by: Heinz Herald; Geza Herczeg; Norman Reilly Raine
- Story by: Heinz Herald; Geza Herczeg
- Based on: Zola and His Time; 1928 book by Matthew Josephson
- Produced by: Henry Blanke
- Starring: Paul Muni; Gloria Holden; Gale Sondergaard; Joseph Schildkraut
- Cinematography: Tony Gaudio
- Edited by: Warren Low
- Music by: Max Steiner
- Distributed by: Warner Bros. Pictures
- Release date: August 11, 1937
- Running time: 116 minutes
- Country: United States
- Language: English

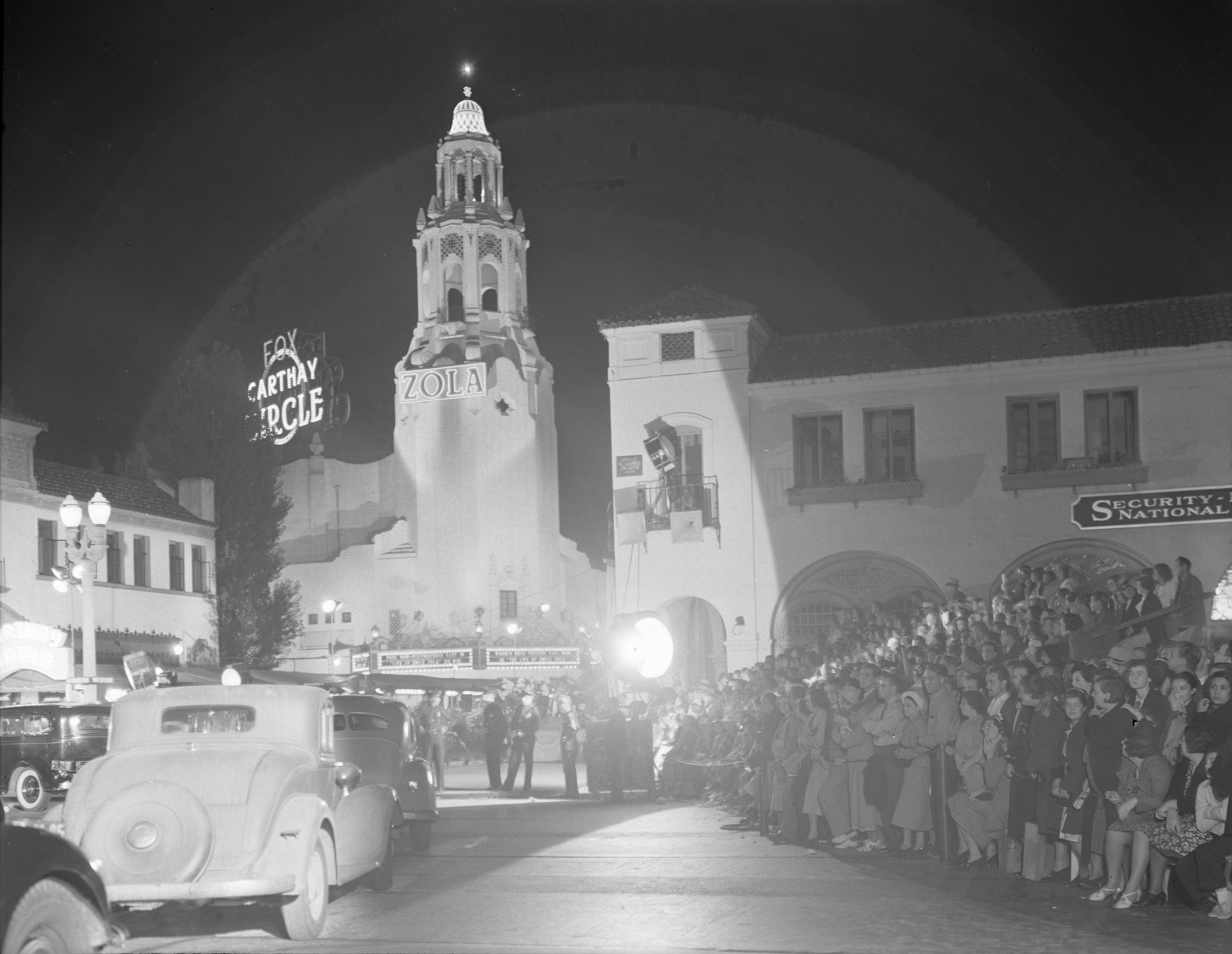
Premiere of The Life of Emile Zola at the Carthay Circle Theater (1937)

The Life of Emile Zola is a 1937 American biographical film about the 19th-century French author Émile Zola starring Paul Muni and directed by William Dieterle.

It premiered at the Los Angeles Carthay Circle Theatre to great critical and financial success. Contemporary reviews ranked it as the greatest biographical film made up to that time.

In 2000, it was selected for preservation in the United States National Film Registry by the Library of Congress as being "culturally, historically, or aesthetically significant."

Produced during the Great Depression and after the Nazi Party had taken power in Germany, the film failed to explore the key issue of antisemitic injustice in France in the late 19th century, when Zola became involved in the Dreyfus affair and worked to gain the officer's release. Some recent studies have noted the film as an example of Hollywood's timidity at the time: antisemitism was not mentioned in the film, nor was "Jew" said in dialogue. Some explicitly anti-Nazi films were canceled in this period, and other content was modified. This was also the period when Hollywood had established the Production Code, establishing an internal censor, in response to perceived threats of external censorship.

The Life of Emile Zola became the second biographical film to win the Academy Award for Best Picture, after The Great Ziegfeld. It was also the first Warner Bros. Pictures release to win Best Picture.

== Plot ==
Set in the mid through late 19th century, the film depicts Émile Zola's early friendship with Post-Impressionist painter Paul Cézanne and his rise to fame through his prolific writing. It also explores his involvement late in the Dreyfus affair.

In 1862 Paris, struggling writer Zola shares a drafty Paris attic with Cézanne. His fiancée Alexandrine procures him a desk clerk job at a bookshop, but he is soon fired after he arouses the ire of his employer and an agent of police with his provocative novel The Confessions of Claude. He then witnesses many injustices in French society, such as a crowded river slum, unlawful mining conditions and corruption in the army and government. Finally, a chance encounter with a street prostitute hiding from a police raid inspires his first bestseller, Nana, an exposé of the steamy underside of Parisian life.

Despite the chief censor's pleading, Zola writes other successful books such as The Downfall, a scathing denunciation of the French commanders' blunders and disunity that led to a disastrous defeat in the Franco-Prussian War of 1870. He becomes rich and famous, marries Alexandrine and settles down to a comfortable life in his mansion. One day, his old friend Cézanne, still poor and unknown, visits him before leaving the city. He accuses Zola of having become complacent because of his success and terminates their friendship.

An intercepted letter for the German embassy confirms that there is a spy within the French general staff. With little thought, the army commanders decide that Captain Alfred Dreyfus, a Jew, is the traitor. He is court-martialed, publicly degraded and imprisoned on Devil's Island in French Guiana.

Later, Colonel Picquart, the new chief of intelligence, discovers evidence implicating Major Walsin-Esterhazy, an infantry officer of Hungarian descent, as the actual spy. However, Picquart is ordered by his superiors to remain silent to avert official embarrassment, and is quickly reassigned to a remote post.

Four years have passed since Dreyfus's degradation. His loyal wife Lucie pleads with Zola to take up her husband's cause. Zola is reluctant to surrender his comfortable life, but Lucie brings forth new evidence to pique his curiosity. He publishes an open letter known as "J'accuse" in the newspaper L'Aurore accusing the high command of covering up the monstrous injustice, and it causes a firestorm throughout Paris. Zola barely escapes from an angry mob incited by military agents provocateurs as riots erupt in the city streets.

As expected, Zola is charged with libel. His attorney Maitre Labori does his best against the presiding judge's refusal to allow him to introduce evidence about the Dreyfus affair and the perjury and biased testimony committed by all the military witnesses, except for Picquart. Zola is found guilty and sentenced to a year in prison and a 3,000-franc fine. He reluctantly accepts his friends' advice flee to London in order to continue the campaign on behalf of Dreyfus.

With the demand for justice reaching a worldwide level, a new French administration finally proclaims that Dreyfus is innocent, and those responsible for the coverup are dismissed or commit suicide. Walsin-Esterhazy flees the country in disgrace. After his return to Paris, Zola dies of accidental carbon monoxide poisoning caused by a faulty stove the night before the public ceremony in which Dreyfus is exonerated and inducted into the Legion of Honor. His body is buried in the Panthéon in Paris and he is given the farewell of a hero and warrior.

== Cast ==
(in order of appearances)

- Paul Muni as Émile Zola
- Gloria Holden as Alexandrine Zola
- Gale Sondergaard as Lucie Dreyfus
- Joseph Schildkraut as Captain Alfred Dreyfus
- Donald Crisp as Maitre Labori
- Erin O'Brien-Moore as Nana
- John Litel as Charpentier
- Henry O'Neill as Colonel Picquart
- Morris Carnovsky as Anatole France, Zola's friend and supporter
- Louis Calhern as Major Dort
- Ralph Morgan as Commander of Paris
- Robert Barrat as Major Walsin-Esterhazy
- Vladimir Sokoloff as Paul Cézanne
- Grant Mitchell as Georges Clemenceau
- Harry Davenport as Chief of Staff
- Robert Warwick as Major Henry
- Charles Richman as M. Delagorgue
- Gilbert Emery as Minister of War
- Walter Kingsford as Colonel Sandherr
- Paul Everton as Assistant Chief of Staff
- Montagu Love as M. Cavaignac
- Frank Sheridan as M. Van Cassell
- Lumsden Hare as Mr. Richards
- Marcia Mae Jones as Helen Richards
- Florence Roberts as Madame Zola, Zola's mother
- Dickie Moore as Pierre Dreyfus, Captain Dreyfus's son
- Rolla Gourvitch as Jeanne Dreyfus, Dreyfus's daughter

== Production ==
In 1936, literary agent Heinz Herald first proposed the story to producer Henry Blanke, and Hal B. Wallis, Warner Bros.' executive producer for biographical pictures, assigned Herald and Geza Herczeg to develop the script. Their first treatment, titled Emile Zola: The Conscience of Humanity, centered around the Dreyfus affair, with Zola's literary career merely a background plot. Herald and Herczeg saw Zola's struggles to be similar to those faced by Louis Pasteur in The Story of Louis Pasteur, and their script ended with Zola triumphantly speaking out as a voice of truth as a parallel for the incipient turmoil taking place in Europe. Their 200-page script draft was submitted in November 1936, which staff writer Norman Reilly Raine was assigned to revise. Blanke supervised the creation of the final script, which included further contributions by Herald, Herczeg and Raine but also those from star Paul Muni, director William Dieterle and Wallis. The final script was ready by February 1937, and an initial budget of $699,000 was allocated to the production of the film.

Wallis and Blanke's relationship during production of the film was contentious; while Wallis wished to follow the successful formula established by The Story of Louis Pasteur, Blanke fought for the integrity of the project. The two men clashed over nearly every aspect of production, including the casting of the female lead; Wallis wished to cast Josephine Hutchinson, who had played Pasteur's wife, but Blanke disagreed and a compromise was reached in the casting of Gloria Holden. Blanke was determined to imbue the picture with authenticity and argued that Muni's appearance should differ starkly from that of the Pasteur picture, but Wallis, concerned with Muni's box-office appeal, overruled Blanke and instructed the makeup artist to maintain Muni's recognizable features above all else. Blanke threatened to leave the project following a bitter dispute over the hiring of a costumer, but Wallis relented.

Filming began in March 1937 and was scheduled for 42 days. Muni's climactic courtroom speech was filmed in one six-minute take, but Wallis requested that Blanke and Dieterle intersperse the scene with crowd shots. At the time, it was the longest continuous courtroom scene. Wallis and Blanke also argued over the quality of actor Ben Welden's performance as Paul Cézanne, and actor Vladimir Sokoloff was brought in to reshoot Welden's scenes. The reshoots caused the production of the film to extend ten days over schedule, and filming was completed on May 10.

Wallis and Blanke also fought over the film's title. While Wallis favored The Story of Emile Zola, Blanke suggested alternatives such as The Truth Is on the March, I Accuse and Destiny before The Life of Emile Zola was chosen, though the film does not actually depict much of Zola's life.

Muni was paid $50,000 for his performance.

== Reception and interpretation ==
Following a successful preview screening excluding Max Steiner's musical score, The Life of Emile Zola premiered on August 11, 1937, and became an immediate sensation. Soon after, Warner Bros. placed full-page advertisements in several Los Angeles newspapers congratulating the cast and crew.

Contemporary reviews were nearly unanimous in their praise. Frank S. Nugent of The New York Times wrote: "Rich, dignified, honest, and strong, it is at once the finest historical film ever made and the greatest screen biography, greater even than The Story of Louis Pasteur with which the Warners squared their conscience last year ... Paul Muni's portrayal of Zola is, without doubt, the best thing he has done."

Variety wrote that the film was "a vibrant, tense and emotional story ... It is finely made and merits high rating as cinema art and significant recognition as major showmanship." Harrison's Reports described it as "A dignified, powerful, and at times stirring historical drama, brilliantly directed, and superbly acted by Paul Muni, as Zola, the great French writer."

Modern Screen’s Leo Townsend described the film as "a fine and beautifully made picture." He commented that the large supporting cast gave "excellent performances" and listed Joseph Schildkraut, Gale Sondergaard, Gloria Holden, Erin O’Brien-Moore and Morris Carnovsky as "outstanding". He wrote that he believed Paul Muni was deserving of an Academy Award for a performance that highlighted his "virtuosity" and that "handling (his role) with quiet and reserve makes it an inspired piece of acting."

John Mosher of The New Yorker praised the film as "a picture of considerable distinction" with "no nonsense."

Writing for Night and Day, Graham Greene offered a neutral review, noting that despite its inaccuracies, "truth to the film mind is the word you see on news-posters." Greene commented that appearances from seemingly significant characters such as Cézanne were largely irrelevant to the plot and that all of the events in the film happen suddenly.

The Life of Emile Zola topped Film Daily's year-end poll of 531 critics naming the best film of the year.

Certain scenes were interpreted at the time as "indirect attacks on Nazi Germany." As David Denby writes about the movie in 2013, "At the end, in an outpouring of the progressive rhetoric that was typical of the thirties, Zola makes a grandiloquent speech on behalf of justice and truth and against nationalist war frenzy." However, the film is silent about the fact that Dreyfus was Jewish and the victim of French antisemitism.

The film was banned in the Canadian province of Quebec in November 1937.The French government allegedly banned the film in 1939, possibly because of the sensitivity of the Dreyfus affair.

On Rotten Tomatoes, the film holds a score of 92% from 72 reviews, with an average rating of 7.5/10. The website's critics consensus reads, "Urgently relevant in an era of escalating bigotry and fascism, The Life of Emile Zola is a respectful and staid tribute to the French novelist, enlivened by Paul Muni's chameleonic prowess." The film is mentioned in the children's novel The Saturdays, relating a coal gas leak incident.

== Academy Award wins and nominations ==
At the 10th Academy Awards, the film received ten nominations (and thereby became the first film in Academy Award history to reach double digits for nominations) and won three awards.

Category	Person	Outcome
Outstanding Production	Warner Bros. (Henry Blanke, producer)	Won
Best Director	William Dieterle	Nominated
Best Actor	Paul Muni (Émile Zola)	Nominated
Supporting Actor	Joseph Schildkraut (Captain Alfred Dreyfus)	Won
Best Writing, Screenplay	Heinz Herald, Geza Herczeg and Norman Reilly Raine	Won
Best Art Direction	Anton Grot	Nominated
Best Music, Score	Max Steiner, awarded to Leo F. Forbstein	Nominated
Best Sound, Recording	Nathan Levinson (Warner Bros. SSD)	Nominated
Best Writing, Original Story	Heinz Herald and Geza Herczeg	Nominated
Best Assistant Director	Russ Saunders	Nominated

== Controversy ==
In his 2013 book titled The Collaboration: Hollywood's Pact with Hitler, Ben Urwand wrote that Hollywood producers made a pact to avoid antagonizing Adolf Hitler and aided the Nazis by suppressing films that portrayed the Nazis' brutality: "The studios cancelled several explicitly anti-Nazi films planned for production, and deleted from several other movies anything that could be construed as critical of the Nazis, along with anything that might be seen as favorable to the Jews—or even a simple acknowledgment that they existed."

Urwand wrote that Jewish studio head Jack L. Warner ordered the word "Jew" to be excised from the script and that Georg Gyssling, the Nazi consul to the United States in Los Angeles, was occasionally allowed to review and provide recommendations on films before they were released, with changes sometimes made based on his comments. However, Urwand's thesis that Warner was collaborating with the Nazis has been strongly disputed by Warner's family members, especially Alicia Meyer.

In his study Hollywood and Hitler, 1933–1939, Thomas Doherty also analyzed the topic. David Denby, who wrote a long overview article about the issue in The New Yorker, points out that while Doherty supports some of Urwand's thesis, Doherty provides more context for the studios' behavior, setting it against the political culture of the period. The studios were under social pressure during the Great Depression to produce films that helped the United States weather the crisis. There were fears of political radicalism in the U.S. while European movements, from the Nazis to communism in the Soviet Union, were considered threats. Denby believes that the predominantly Jewish studio heads were timid and overly cautious, appearing to be fearful of their place in American society.
