= Charles-Arthur Gonse =

French military officer (1838-1917)

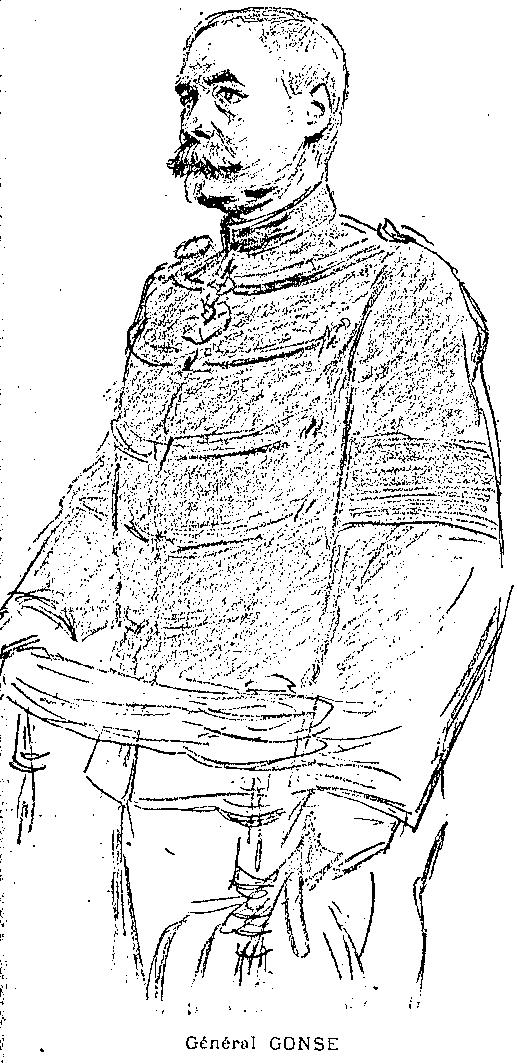
Pucture of Arthur Gonse Ilustr on 12/02/1898

Major General Charles-Arthur Gonse (19 September 1838, Paris – 18 December 1917, Cormeilles-en-Parisis) was Deputy Chief of Staff under the authority of General Raoul Le Mouton de Boisdeffre during the Dreyfus affair.

When confronted with overwhelming evidence that Ferdinand Walsin Esterhazy was guilty of the espionage for Germany, for which Alfred Dreyfus had wrongfully been convicted, Gonse simply overlooked it and refused to recognize Dreyfus' innocence.

== Biography ==
=== Family ===
Born in 1838, Charles-Arthur Gonse (Arthur being his given name) was the son of Jean Félix Emmanuel Gonse, of the postal administration, and Louise Stéphanie Courtin, daughter of the general manager Charles Courtin and granddaughter of the architect Étienne-Chérubin Leconte. He was the brother of the director of museums and art critic Louis Gonse.

=== Career in the General Staff ===
Arthur Gonse entered Saint-Cyr in 1856. He then entered the Staff College. He was a second lieutenant on the General Staff in 1861. He left for Algeria in 1868, and was part of the staff of the Constantine division until 1870.

At the beginning of the Franco-Prussian War of 1870, he served on the staff of the XIII Army Corps and participated at the end of August in the March on Mézières, then in the retreat to Paris. During the Siege of Paris, he was on the defence staff, and participated on numerous occasions in the relief operations against the Germans.

In 1880, Gonse transferred to the artillery and became a lieutenant colonel in 1885. In 1887, he was appointed chief of staff of the XIX Corps. Promoted to colonel in 1888, he joined the army general staff where he was appointed head of the 4th Bureau. He was also a professor at the War College.

He became a brigadier general in 1893 and was appointed deputy chief of the general staff. In this capacity he held various positions in the higher military bodies and was also appointed State Councillor on special assignment in 1895.

=== The Dreyfus Affair ===
Convinced from the beginning of Dreyfus's guilt, Gonse refused to support Picquart when the latter discovered evidence of Dreyfus's innocence.

Lieutenant-Colonel Picquart recounted that when he discovered evidence of Esterhazy's guilt and showed it to Gonse, Gonse initially seemed convinced, remarking: "So we would have been wrong!" However, he then ordered the two cases to be kept separate. When Gonse asked, "What does it matter to you if he stays on Devil's Island?", Picquart retorted: "I will not take this secret to my grave!" Despite this, Gonse maintained his position, covering up the activities of Henry and Paty de Clam to exonerate Esterhazy in the name of state interests and the finality of the court's verdict.

Some authors have spoken of collusion, which is confirmed by the latest history of the Affair, which further demonstrates the grave responsibility Gonse bore in the relentless persecution of Dreyfus and Picquart and the protection of Esterhazy.

After the affair and the recognition of Dreyfus's innocence, Gonse was gradually removed from his various positions. He was ultimately placed in the reserve section in 1903.

He died in 1917.
