= Georges-Gabriel de Pellieux =

French army officer (1842-1900)

George Gabriel de Pellieux
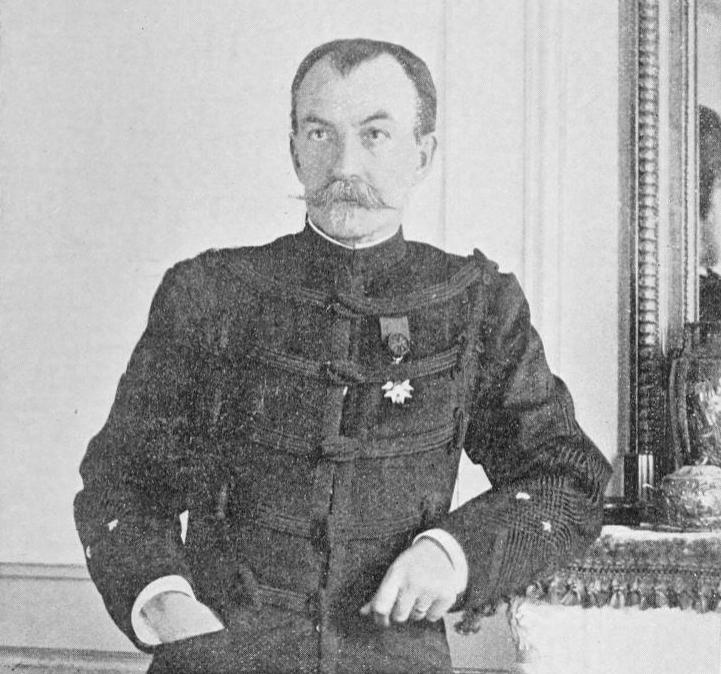
- Général de Pellieux in 1898
- Born: 6 September 1842; Strasbourg, France
- Died: 15 July 1900 (aged 57); Quimper, France
- Occupation: Brigadier general
- Known for: Testimony at trial of Émile Zola

George Gabriel de Pellieux (6 September 1842 – 15 July 1900) was a French army officer who was best known for ignoring evidence during the Dreyfus affair, a scandal in which a Jewish officer was convicted of treason on the basis of a forgery.

== Early years ==
George-Gabriel de Pellieux was born in Strasbourg, France on 6 September 1842. His father, Captain Jean Honoré Théodore Pellieux, served in the 10th artillery regiment. George-Gabriel de Pellieux entered the military college of Saint Cyr when he was seventeen, and in 1861 became a sub-lieutenant in the infantry. He was promoted to lieutenant in 1864 and captain in 1868. During the Franco-Prussian War (19 July 1870 – 10 May 1871) he was aide to General Eugène Arnaudeau and officer attached to the general staff. He was decorated with the Legion of Honor in May 1871, effective 14 October 1870.

De Pellieux served in Algeria as aide to General Carteret between 1872 and 1878. In 1880 he was promoted to battalion chief. He was made an officer of the Legion of Honour on 7 February 1882. He was on the staff of General François Auguste Logerot in Tunisia from 1882 to 1886. In 1890 he was promoted to colonel. He was appointed Chief of Staff of the 13th Corps in Clermont-Ferrand in 1892. In 1894 he was promoted to brigadier general. In 1897 de Pellieux was made military commander of the Seine department and provisional commander of Paris.

== Esterhazy investigation ==
In January 1895 Alfred Dreyfus, a Jewish army officer, was found guilty of authoring an anonymous note (bordereau) to the military attaché of the German embassy in Paris, and was exiled for life to Devil's Island off the coast of French Guiana. Anti-semitism played a role in the court-martial verdict. Later Lieutenant-Colonel Georges Picquart, head of the Intelligence Service, found evidence that Major Ferdinand Walsin Esterhazy had written the bordereau, not Dreyfus.

In November 1897 de Pellieux was ordered by General Billot to conduct an inquiry into the allegations against Esterhazy. He issued a report after three days in which he stated Esterhazy was not guilty and the Dreyfus case should not be reopened. When more evidence against Esterhazy was revealed, Pellieux was asked to reopen his inquiry. He did not review the new material. Instead he attacked Picquart's credibility and again declared Esterhazy innocent. The minister of war then ordered a formal investigation by Major Ravary. On 31 December 1897 Ravary found there was no basis for the charges against Esterhazy. To close the matter, on 9 January 1898 Esterhazy was arrested, tried and acquitted in two days in a conspicuously biased trial. Esterhazy thanked General de Pellieux for exposing the conspiracy against him.

=== Zola trial ===
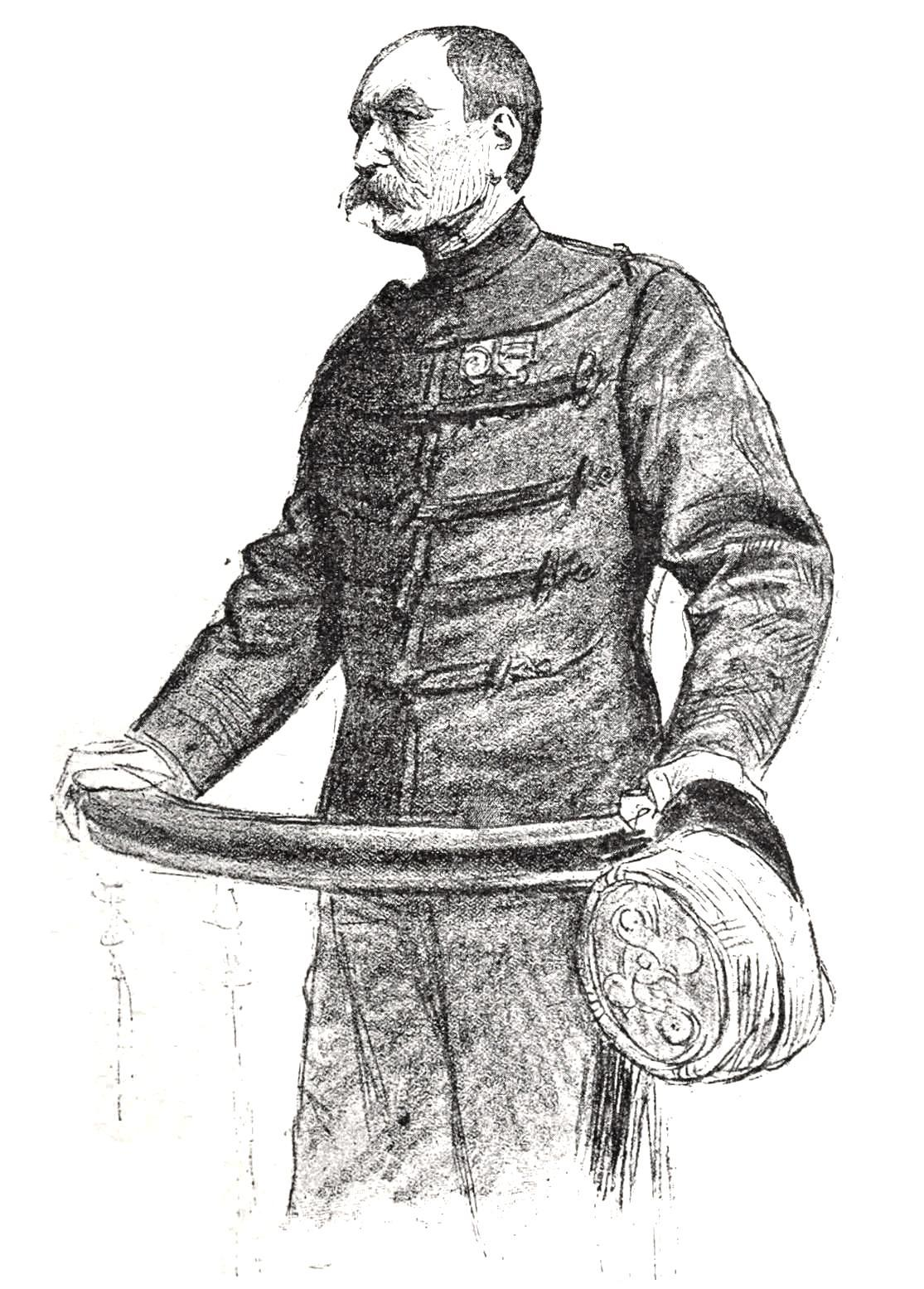
Pellieux testifying at the 7th session of the Zola trial, 1898, by Louis Rémy Sabattier for l'Illustration

The well-known writer Émile Zola became involved in a campaign to exonerate Dreyfus, and wrote a passionate attack on his persecutors in J'Accuse…!, published on 13 January 1898. He wrote, "I accuse General de Pellieux and Major Ravary of having led a villainous inquiry, by which I mean a most monstrously one-sided inquiry..." In February 1898 Zola was tried for libel against the officers who conducted the Dreyfus court-martial. When Piquart took the stand, de Pellieux attempted to discredit him. He accused Picquart of practicing hypnotism, occultism and table turning, and said he was neurotic. Pellieux called the bordereau "absolute proof of Dreyfus's guilt". On 23 February 1898 Zola was convicted and given the maximum sentence. Later the verdict was overturned and a fresh trial scheduled. In February 1898 Picquart was cashiered from the army. He was arrested and imprisoned on 13 July 1898.

On 30 August 1898 Lieutenant-Colonel Hubert-Joseph Henry admitted while under arrest to having forged the evidence against Dreyfus. He committed suicide the next day in his cell in the Mont-Valérien fortress. After the news of Henry's confession and suicide became public, de Pellieux resigned from his positions with a very harsh letter, claiming that the General Staff had been "fooled by people without honor" and was "no longer able to count on the confidence of subordinates without which command is impossible" and he himself was "unable to trust those of my chiefs who made me work on forgeries".

=== Coup d'état attempt ===
In September 1898 the Brisson government decided to allow Dreyfus to appeal his conviction. This caused rage among the nationalists. There were rumors that a military mutiny was being planned, led by General de Pellieux or General Émile Zurlinden. The Brisson government collapsed on 25 October 1898. Paul Déroulède of the League of Patriots and Jules Guérin of the Anti-Semitic League planned to take advantage of the funeral of President Félix Faure on 23 February 1899 to stage a coup, using the escorting cavalcade led by Pellieux as the spearhead. Pellieux first vaguely agreed, then decided against involvement and had himself replaced by General Roget. The attempt fizzled out. After the crisis de Pellieux was reassigned.

In the summer of 1899 the court of appeals ordered a new trial for Dreyfus. Before the trial began de Pellieux stood before a council of inquiry to answer charges of collusion with Esterhazy. At the trial Dreyfus was again found guilty, to general surprise. Dreyfus received a Presidential pardon on 19 September 1899, but was denied the right to clear his name in a trial (he was eventually rehabilitated by the Court of Cassation in 1906 and reinstated in the Army). George Gabriel de Pellieux died on 15 July 1900 in Quimper, Brittany, France.
