= Lucie Dreyfus =

Wife of Alfred Dreyfus

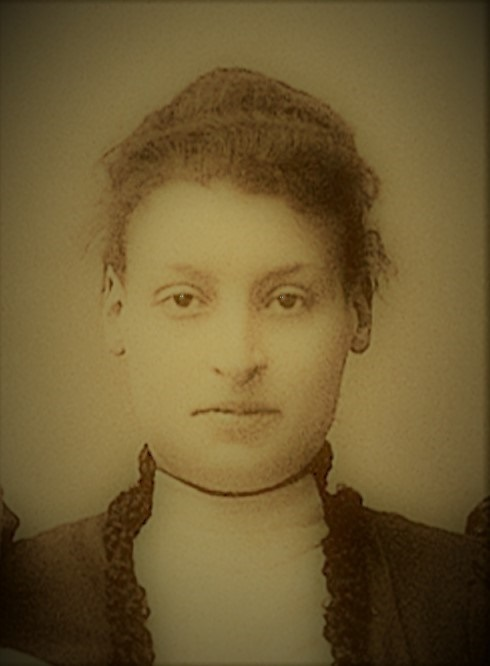
- Lucie c. 1891
- Born: Lucie Hadamard; August 23, 1869; Chatou, Second French Empire
- Died: December 14, 1945 (aged 76); 17th arrondissement of Paris, Provisional Government of the French Republic
- Burial place: Montparnasse Cemetery
- Spouse: Alfred Dreyfus (m. 1890)
- Children: Pierre Dreyfus; Jeanne Lévy
- Relatives: Paul Hadamard (brother)

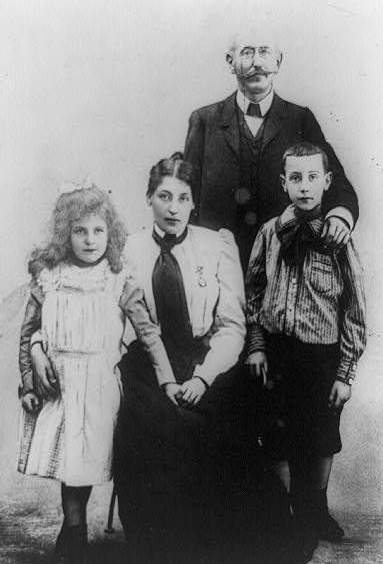
Alfred, Lucie, Pierre Léon and Jeanne

Lucie Dreyfus-Hadamard (23 August 1869 – 14 December 1945) was the wife of Alfred Dreyfus, a Jewish French Army officer who due to antisemitism was wrongfully accused and convicted of being a German spy and imprisoned on Devil's Island in French Guiana before being exonerated and released.

== Life ==
Lucie Hadamard was born into a Parisian Jewish family in 1869. She married Alfred Dreyfus in 1890. The pair had two children: Pierre, born 1891, and Jeanne, born 1893.

In 1894, as part of the Dreyfus Affair, Alfred Dreyfus was court-martialed for espionage and sentenced to a penal colony. Lucie worked to convince French authorities to exonerate her husband. She petitioned Parliament in 1896 but her petition was denied. In 1898 she published a collection of his letters under the title Letters of an Innocent. A subsequent petition resulted in a second court-martial being convened, which ultimately resulted in Alfred's exoneration.

During the First World War Lucie worked as a Red Cross nurse. Alfred died in 1935. During the Second World War, Lucie lived in a convent to avoid becoming a victim of the Holocaust; a granddaughter, Madeleine Lévy, was killed in Auschwitz. Lucie died in Paris in December 1945, seven months after the end of World War II in Europe.

== Cultural depictions ==
In Dreyfus (1930, Germany) Lucie Dreyfus was played by Grete Mosheim.

In Dreyfus (1931, UK) she was played by Beatrix Thomson.

In The Life of Emile Zola (1937), Lucie was played by Gale Sondergaard.

In the 1958 film I Accuse!, Lucie was played by Viveca Lindfors.

In An Officer and a Spy (2020; French: J'Accuse), Lucie was played by Swan Starosta.
