= Hubert-Joseph Henry =

French Officer involved in the Dreyfus affair (1846-1898)

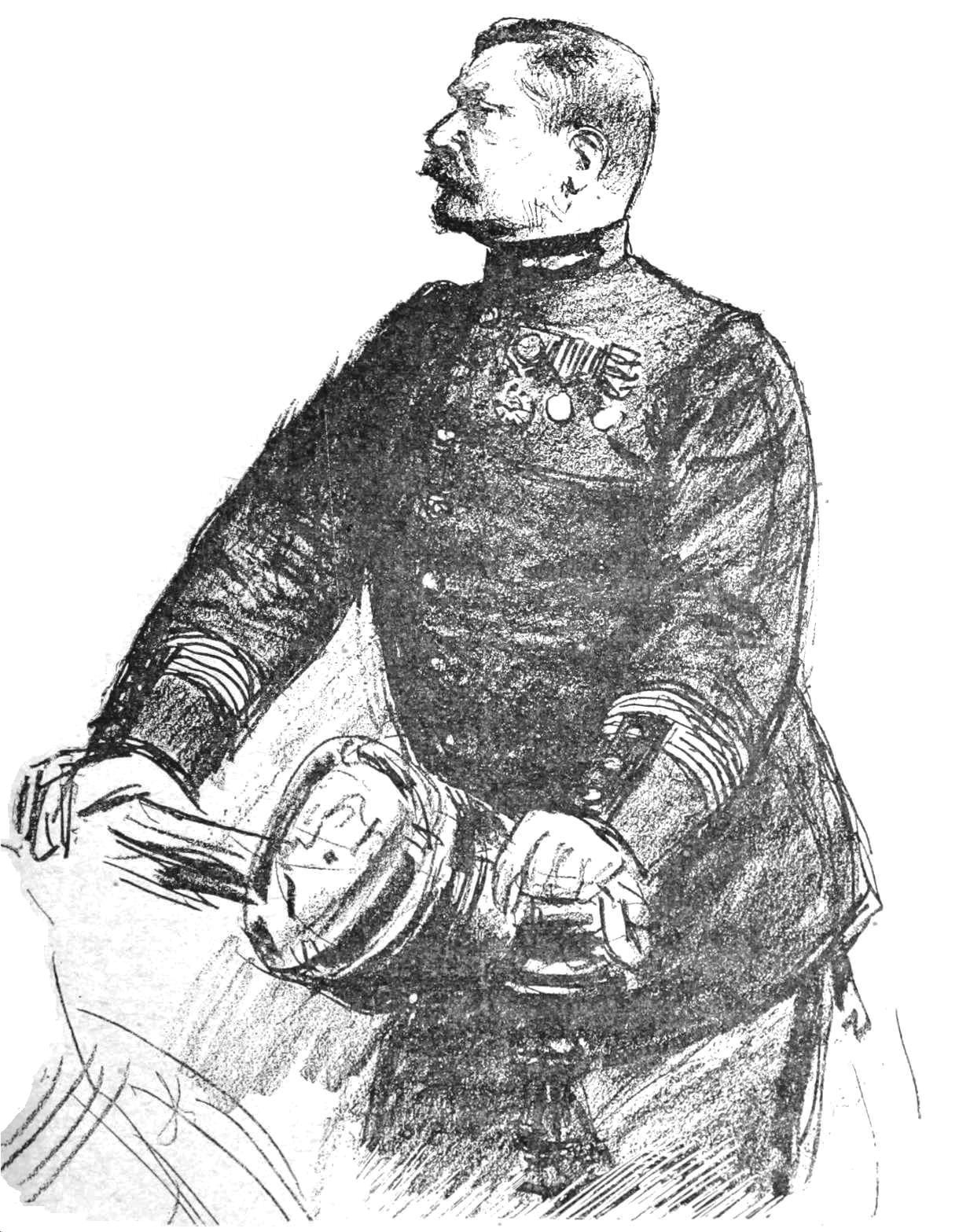
- Henry at the 10th session of the Zola trial, 1898, by Louis Rémy Sabattier for l'Illustration
- Born: 2 June 1846; Pogny, Marne, France
- Died: 31 August 1898 (aged 52); Fort Mont-Valérien, Paris, France
- Occupation: Soldier
- Known for: Forgery related to Dreyfus affair

Hubert-Joseph Henry (2 June 1846 – 31 August 1898) was a French lieutenant-colonel in 1897 involved in the Dreyfus affair. Arrested for having forged evidence against Alfred Dreyfus, he was found dead in his prison cell. He was considered a hero by the Anti-Dreyfusards.

== Early life and career ==
Hubert-Joseph Henry was born into a farming family. He enlisted in the French Army as an infantryman in 1865. Promoted to sergeant-major in 1868, Henry served in the Franco-Prussian War, being captured twice but each time successfully escaping. In 1870, he was commissioned as a lieutenant in an infantry regiment. In 1875 Henry was appointed as an aide to General Joseph de Miribel, Chief of the General Staff. Four years later Henry, now a captain, joined the Statistics Section of the Ministry of War - the office responsible for counter-intelligence. He subsequently served in Tunisia, Tonkin and Algeria before returning to counter-intelligence duties in Paris.

Lieutenant Colonel Georges Picquart, appointed new chief of army's intelligence section in 1895, was convinced that Major Henry had forged a document in order to prove definitively that Alfred Dreyfus was a traitor and German spy. Thanks to the general staff's and government's support, Henry was promoted Lieutenant Colonel, whereas Picquart was initially removed from office, the army, and even arrested.

== Dreyfus affair ==
In August 1898, Minister of War Godefroy Cavaignac ordered Captain Louis Cuignet to examine the documents which sent Captain Dreyfus to his exile from France to Devil's Island. This matter should have been brought before Parliament, owing to the impossibility of obtaining a revision of the legal process, but due to Cavaignac's nature he threw caution to the wind. Cuignet soon learned that the most damning evidence brought to the court in 1896 by Henry was in fact a forgery using two separate documents, later known as the "faux Henry," to achieve the sentence he and his supporters desired. Henry was called in for questioning on 30 August by Cavaignac and managed to protest his innocence for only an hour before he confessed. This led to the resignations of Generals de Pellieux and de Boisdeffre, who admitted having been duped by the forgery.

== Imprisonment and death ==
Henry was sent to the military prison at Fort Mont-Valérien. The day after he arrived he began to write: to his wife, "I see that except for you everyone is going to abandon me"; to his superior General Gonse, "I absolutely must speak to you"; in one cryptic comment seemingly implying his guilt he wrote "You know in whose interest I acted." The meaning of this comment has never been explained; it may have referred to Ferdinand-Walsin Esterhazy, who was the actual author of the bordereau document, which had been used to arrest Captain Dreyfus, or perhaps to Lt Colonel Sandherr, another superior who passed on the bordereau to other high-ranking officers, such as the Minister of War, General Auguste Mercier.

Henry was found dead in his cell on the morning of 31 August 1898, having died at some point the previous night. The cause of death was a wound to the throat. While halfway through a bottle of rum and midway through another letter to his wife, Henry wrote "I am like a Madman" and proceeded to slit his throat with a shaving razor. On the day of his arrest, the Colonel had been searched and no razor had been found; this sparked another outcry of murder. However, due to Henry's actions, letters and state of mind, a cause of suicide was declared.

== Post-death and the Henry Monument ==
At first, anti-Dreyfusards such as Édouard Drumont and Henri Rochefort, upon hearing of Henry's suicide, felt as though it was as good as declaring the guilt of a forged document and therefore Dreyfus' innocence to the people of France. However, Drumont's La Libre Parole sponsored a public subscription in favour of Henry's widow, in which the donors were invited to vent all their anger against Jews. Also a Royalist newspaper titled La Gazette de France praised their former conspirator for sacrificing his life for the Fatherland. Charles Maurras declared that the 'gallant soldier's' forgery stood among his "finest feats of war".

The Henry Monument was a national fund drive for the legal defence of Henry's widow in the preservation of the Henry family name. Over 130,000 francs were raised and the comments that signatories contributed were released in book form in 1899 filling more than 700 pages. Though not all comments expressed anti-Semitism, many did.

== In popular culture ==
- The Dreyfus Affair, directed by Georges Méliès and released in 1899, was a series of one-minute films re-enacting key moments from the Dreyfus Affair. The fifth installment depicts Henry's suicide.
- Ferdinand Hart played Henry in the 1930 German film Dreyfus, based on a novel by Bruno Weil. Henry Caine took over the role in the 1931 British remake, Dreyfus
- He is portrayed by Robert Warwick in the 1937 film The Life of Emile Zola
- He is played by Harry Andrews in the 1958 film I Accuse!
- He is portrayed by Peter Firth in the 1991 television film Prisoner of Honour
- He is portrayed by Grégory Gadebois in the 2019 film An Officer and a Spy

== Bibliography ==
- France and the Dreyfus Affair - A Documentary History, Michael Burns
- 2013 Robert Harris, An Officer and a Spy, London: Hutchinson. 2013. ISBN 978-0-09-194455-1
