= Louis Gonse =

French art historian (1846–1921)

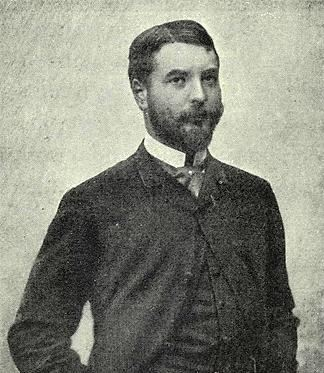
Louis Gonse (date unknown)

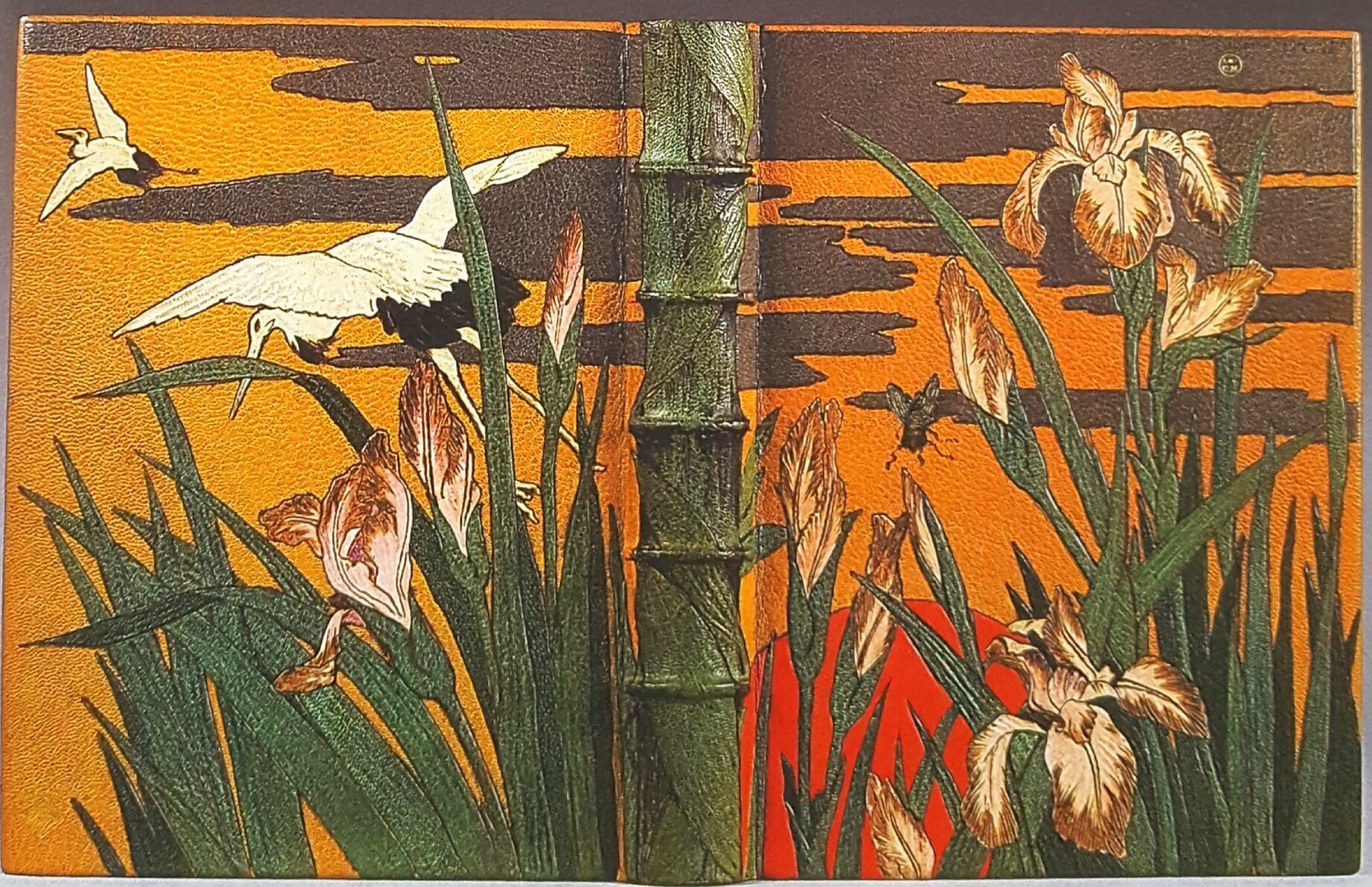
Binding and cover for L’Art japonais by Camille Martin

Louis Gonse (16 November 1846, in Paris – 19 December 1921, in Paris) was an art historian, Editor-in-Chief of the Gazette des Beaux-Arts and Vice-President of the Commission for Historic Monuments. He was also one of the first European experts in Japanese art.

== Biography ==
His father, Jean Félix Emmanuel Gonse, was a civil servant who worked for the Post Office. His mother, Louise Stéphanie, née Courtin; daughter of Charles Courtin, Director General of Military Hospitals. Her grandfather was the architect, Étienne-Chérubin Leconte.

He obtained a law degree and audited classes at the École Nationale des Chartes, where he initially expressed an interest in Gothic art. He soon shifted his interests to Japanese art, enlisting Hayashi Tadamasa to help him with his research, and published his first article on the subject in Le Moniteur Universel, in 1873.

After collaborating with several artistic journals, he became Editor-in-Chief of the Gazette des Beaux-Arts. In 1883, he organized a major retrospective of Japanese art and published L’Art japonais (Paris, Maison Quantin), which established his reputation as an expert. In

In 1891, he became a member of the Commission on Historical Monuments and would later serve as its Vice-President. Also in 1891, he wrote a "Report for the creation of a Museum Fund" that was instrumental in establishing the Réunion des Musées Nationaux.

He was knighted in the Legion of Honor in 1889. Later that same year, the Japanese government awarded him the Order of the Rising Sun. From 1917, he was Vice-President of the Council of National Museums and, just prior to his death, became an Officer in the Legion. In addition to his cultural activities, he served as the mayor of Cormeilles-en-Parisis from 1892 to 1899 and from 1900 to 1919. A street there is named after him.

His son, Emmanuel Gonse, became an architect. His brother, Charles-Arthur Gonse, an Adjutant to General Raoul Le Mouton de Boisdeffre, was involved in the Dreyfus Affair. His name is mentioned in J'accuse by Émile Zola.
