= Brault =

Brault is a surname. Notable people with the surname include:

- Albert Brault (born 1937), American chemist and inventor
- Jacques Brault (1933–2022), French Canadian poet and translator
- James W. Brault (1932–2008), American scientist, pioneer of Fourier transform spectroscopy and other forms of spectroscopy
- Jean Brault, head of Groupaction Marketing and party in the Canadian sponsorship scandal "AdScam"
- Michel Brault (1928–2013), Canadian cinematographer, film director, producer and screenwriter
- Pierre F. Brault (1939–2014), Canadian television composer
- Sarah-Anne Brault (born 1989), Canadian olympian triathlete
- Steven Brault (born 1992), American professional baseball pitcher
- Sylvain Brault, Canadian cinematographer
- William Brault (1927–2012), American businessman
