= Jean Sandherr =

French military officer (1846–1897)

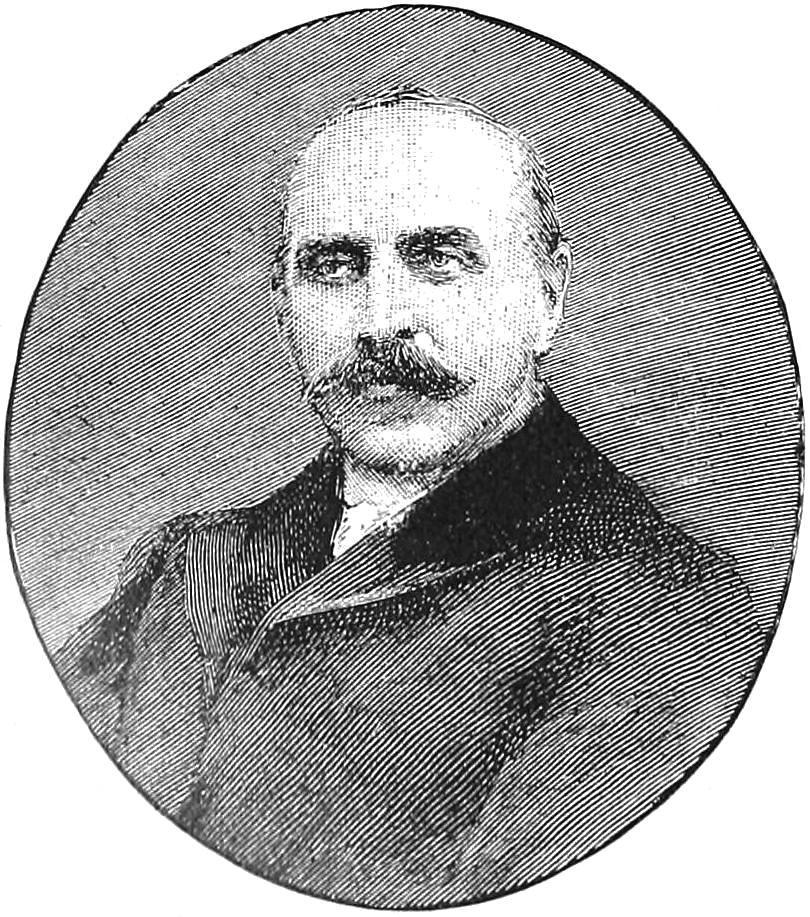
- Born: June 6, 1846; Mulhouse
- Died: May 24, 1897 (aged 50)
- Occupation: Army officer

Colonel Nicolas Jean Robert Conrad Auguste Sandherr (6 June 1846 – 24 May 1897) was a French military officer involved in the Dreyfus Affair.

== Early life and career ==
Sandherr was born in Mulhouse, in Alsace, then a part of France and also the hometown of the Dreyfus family. The son of a notary at the Mulhouse commercial court, Sandherr joined the French infantry via the military academy of Saint-Cyr. He was promoted successively to sub-lieutenant in the light infantry in 1866, lieutenant in 1870, and captain in 1873. In 1876, his high potential gained him admission in the first class of students at the École supérieure de guerre and he left the academy breveted as a major.

Wounded in combat at the start of the Franco-Prussian War of 1870, Sandherr was named a Knight of the Legion of Honor in September of that year. He served as captain of the 2nd Algerian Tirailleurs Regiment (skirmishers) in Tunisia at the time that it was annexed as a protectorate. He was charged with classifying Tunisian tribes by their hostility to the French presence.

== Head of the Statistical Section ==
Promoted to major in 1885, he joined the “Statistical Section” of the army general staff, the harmless name used to disguise the French military's counter-espionage service. In 1887, he took command of the Section. He was made an officer of the Legion of Honour in 1888. Promoted to lieutenant-colonel in 1891, he was placed under the direct orders of General Gonse, at the start of the Dreyfus Affair.

== Dreyfus Affair ==
Sandherr was assisted by Commandant Henry, an officer who had the total confidence of General Gonse. In September 1894, the Statistical Section intercepted a handwritten note found in the wastepaper basket of the German ambassador in Paris, thanks to a household servant in the embassy. The document established that French military secrets had been handed over to the Germans, then considered a national enemy. Sandherr gathered a secret commission of inquiry that hastily decided on Captain Alfred Dreyfus as the perpetrator. Very quickly, Dreyfus was arrested and condemned.

Promoted to colonel on 14 April 1895, Sandherr left his job at the Statistical Section on 1 July that year to take command of the 20th Infantry Regiment at Montauban. His successor at the Statistical Section was Lieutenant-Colonel Georges Picquart, who would effectively agitate for and support Dreyfus’ rehabilitation. The scandal escalated in 1898 when it became apparent that the prosecution's case had been fabricated and incriminating documents had been forged by Commandant Henry.

Sandherr did not live to see the end of the Dreyfus Affair although he was one of its initiators. Struck by a general paralysis (a neurosyphilis-incited meningitis), he had to leave active service in December 1896 and succumbed to his sickness before the scandal came to light.
