= Ferdinand Walsin Esterhazy =

French army officer (1847–1923)

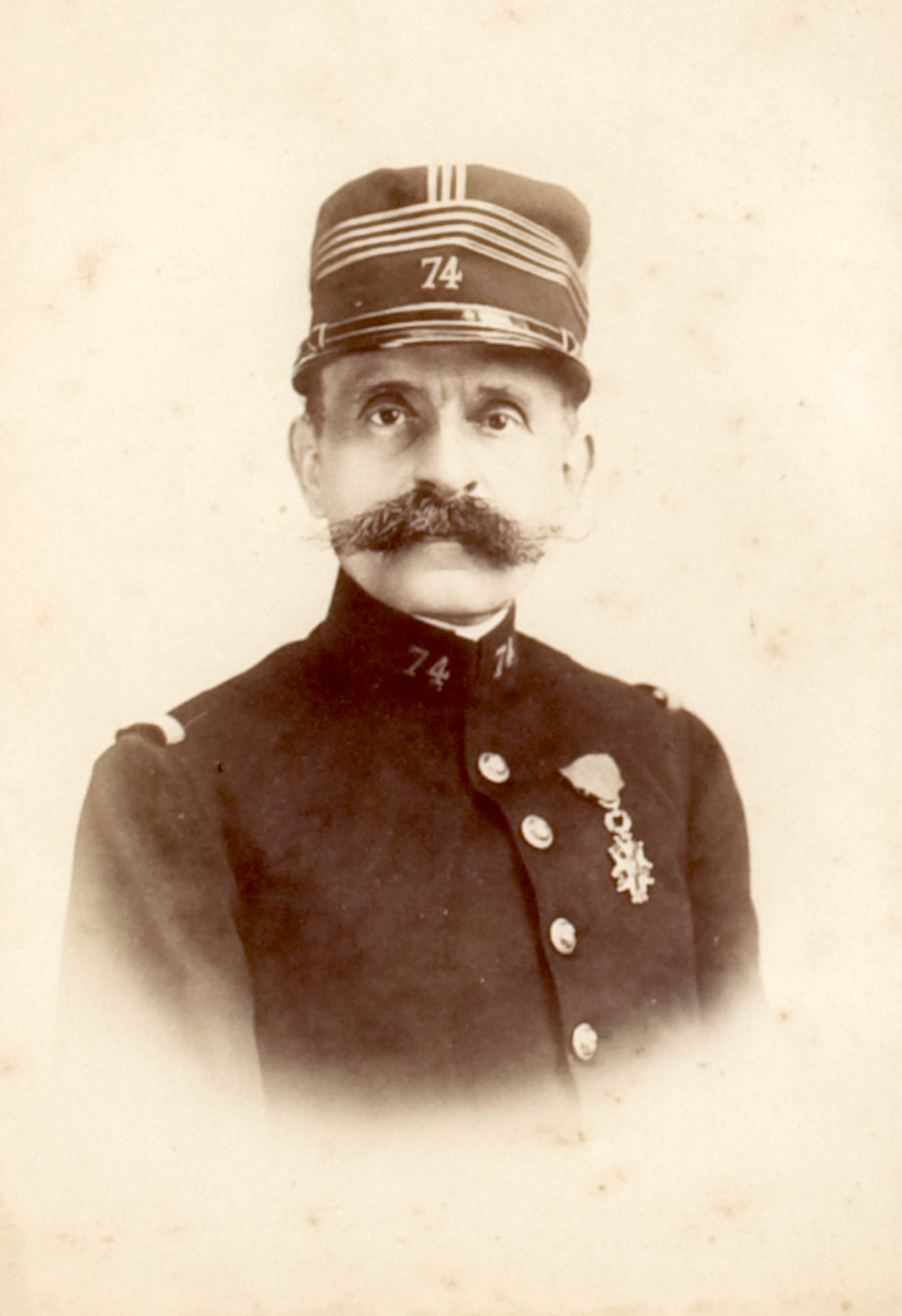
- Esterhazy, c. 1893-1898
- Born: Charles Marie Ferdinand Walsin Esterhazy; 16 December 1847; Paris, France
- Died: 21 May 1923 (aged 75); Harpenden, England, UK
- Military career
- Allegiance: Austrian Empire (French Third Republic) France (German Empire) Germany
- Branch: Imperial Austrian Army; French Army
- Service years: 1870–1898
- Rank: Major
- Units: French Foreign Legion; 74th Line Infantry Regiment
- Conflicts: Austro-Prussian War; Franco-Prussian War

Charles Marie Ferdinand Walsin Esterhazy (16 December 1847 – 21 May 1923) was an officer in the French Army from 1870 to 1898. He gained notoriety as a spy for the German Empire and the actual perpetrator of the act of treason of which Captain Alfred Dreyfus was wrongfully accused and convicted in 1894.

After evidence against Esterhazy was discovered and made public, he was eventually subjected to a closed military trial in 1898, only to be officially found not guilty. Esterhazy retired from the military with the rank of major in 1898 and fled, by way of Brussels, to England, where he lived in the town of Harpenden in Hertfordshire until his death in 1923.

== Biography ==
=== Ancestry ===
Charles Marie Ferdinand Walsin-Esterhazy was born in Paris, France, the son of General Ferdinand Walsin-Esterhazy (1807–1857), who later distinguished himself as division commander in the Crimean War. His paternal grandfather, Jean Marie Auguste Walsin-Esterhazy, born in 1767 at Valleraugue, was the illegitimate son of Countess Marie Anne Esterhazy de Galántha (1741–1823), by her affair with Jean André César de Ginestous (1725–1810), governor of Le Vigan (Gard).

Countess Marie's son Jean was adopted by Dr Walsin, a French doctor in the service of the Esterházy princely family. Growing up under the name of Jean Marie Auguste Walsin, he became a business man and landowner in Nîmes, and added the name of Esterházy, apparently without the agreement of the family, after being acknowledged by his mother about 1797. This branch of the Esterházys had settled in France at the end of the 17th century and provided military officers to the hussar regiments of France.

=== Early life and military career ===
Charles Ferdinand Walsin Esterhazy was left an orphan in September 1857, aged only nine. After some schooling at the Lycée Bonaparte in Paris, he attempted in vain to enter the École spéciale militaire de Saint-Cyr. He disappears from public records in 1865: by 1869 he had been enlisted in the Legion of Antibes, a unit of French volunteers in the service of Pope Pius IX. According to some sources, he served in the Imperial Austrian Army during the 1866 Austro-Prussian War, claiming to be an Esterhazy Count.

=== Franco-Prussian War ===
In June 1870, his uncle's influence enabled Esterhazy to be commissioned into the French Foreign Legion. It was an irregular appointment, as he had neither been promoted from the ranks after service as a non-commissioned officer, nor had graduated from a military academy. However, the start of the Franco-Prussian War in July precluded any action being taken against him. He then assumed the title of Count, to which he was not entitled.

There being a dearth of officers after the catastrophic Battle of Sedan, Esterhazy was able to pass muster as a lieutenant and then as a captain. He served as an infantry officer in the campaigns of the Loire and of the Jura Mountains. After peace was declared, he remained in the army.

=== Post-war Career ===
Between 1880 and 1882, Esterhazy was employed to translate German at the French military counter-intelligence section, where he became acquainted with Major Henry and Lieutenant Colonel Sandherr, both to become major figures in the Dreyfus affair. He was then employed at the French War Ministry. He never appeared in his regiment at Beauvais, and for about five years led a life of dissipation in Paris, as a result of which his small fortune was soon squandered.

In 1882, Esterhazy was attached to the expedition sent to Tunis. While there, he was employed in the Intelligence Department, then, in the Native Affairs Department of the regency. On his own initiative, he inserted a citation within official records mention of his "exploits in war", which was later recognised as being falsely concocted.

Returning to France in 1885, Esterhazy remained in garrison at Marseille for a long time. Having come to the end of his financial resources, he married in 1886, but he soon spent his wife's dowry. In 1888, she demanded a separation.

In 1892, through the influence of General Félix Gustave Saussier, Esterhazy succeeded in getting a nomination as Garrison-Major in the Seventy-Fourth Regiment of the line at Rouen. Being, thus, in the neighborhood of Paris, he resumed a life of speculation and excess. His inheritance squandered, Esterhazy had tried to retrieve his fortune in gambling-houses and on the stock-exchange: hard pressed by his creditors, he had recourse to extreme measures.

Having seconded André Crémieu-Foa in his duel with Édouard Drumont in 1892, Esterhazy claimed that this action had made his family, as well as his military seniors, quarrel with him. He produced false letters to support this allegation and threatened to kill both himself and his children. Through the medium of Zadoc Kahn, chief rabbi of France, Esterhazy obtained assistance from the Rothschild family (June 1894). At the same time, he was on good terms with the editors of the antisemitic newspaper La Libre Parole, which he supplied with information.

For an officer whose original commission had been irregular, Esterhazy's military advancement had been unusually rapid: Lieutenant in 1874, Captain in 1880, decorated in 1882, Major in 1892. The reports on him were generally excellent. Nevertheless, he considered himself wronged. In his letters, he continually launched into recrimination and abuse against his chiefs. He made negative written comments on the French Army, and even France herself, for which he predicted and hoped that new disasters were in store.

=== Dreyfus Affair ===
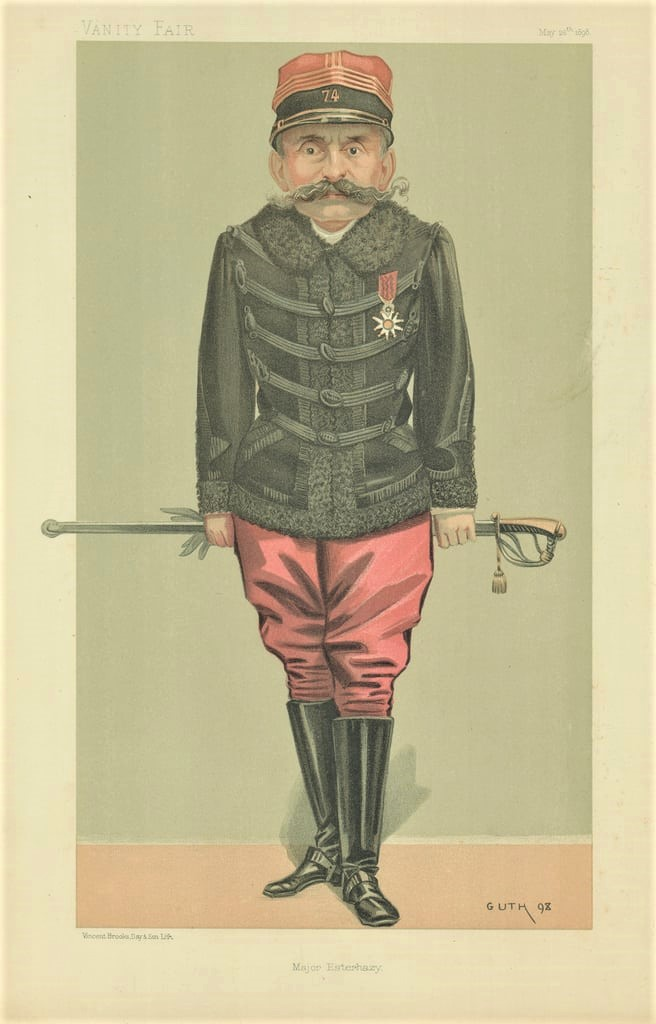
Esterhazy as caricatured by Jean Baptiste Guth in Vanity Fair, May 1898

The Dreyfus affair was triggered in September 1894, when an office cleaner at the German Embassy in Paris, who was also an agent of French military intelligence, passed on to her French contacts a handwritten memorandum (widely known as the bordereau), evidently written by an unnamed French officer, offering the German Embassy various confidential military documents.

Captain Alfred Dreyfus was picked by the army as the alleged traitor, in October 1894. Among those who might have had access to some of the documents, suspicion seems to have fallen on Dreyfus mainly because he was a Jew. The official evidence against him depended overwhelmingly on the contention that his handwriting matched that on the bordereau. Convicted, he was cashiered (formally stripped of his military rank in a public ceremony of degradation), and then shipped to the penal colony of Devil's Island (L'île du Diable) off the coast of French Guiana.

In 1896, Lieutenant-Colonel Georges Picquart, the then-new head of the Intelligence Service, uncovered a letter sent by Maximilian von Schwartzkoppen (at the time German military attache to Paris) to Esterhazy. After comparison of Esterhazy's handwriting with that of the bordereau, he became convinced of Esterhazy's guilt of the crime for which Dreyfus had been convicted.

In 1897, after fruitless efforts to persuade his superiors to take the new evidence seriously and being transferred to Tunisia in an effort to silence him, Picquart provided proof to Dreyfus's lawyers. They started a campaign to bring Esterhazy to justice. In 1898, an ex-lover of Esterhazy made public letters of his in which he expressed his hatred of France and his contempt for the army. However, Esterhazy was still protected by the Army's General Staff, which did not want to see the judgment of 1895 put into doubt.

Esterhazy asked for a trial behind closed doors by the French Military Justice (10–11 January 1898). He was acquitted, a judgment which ignited anti-Semitic riots in Paris.

On 13 January 1898, Émile Zola published his famous J'Accuse…!, which accused the French government of anti-Semitism and especially focussed on the court-martial and jailing of Dreyfus.

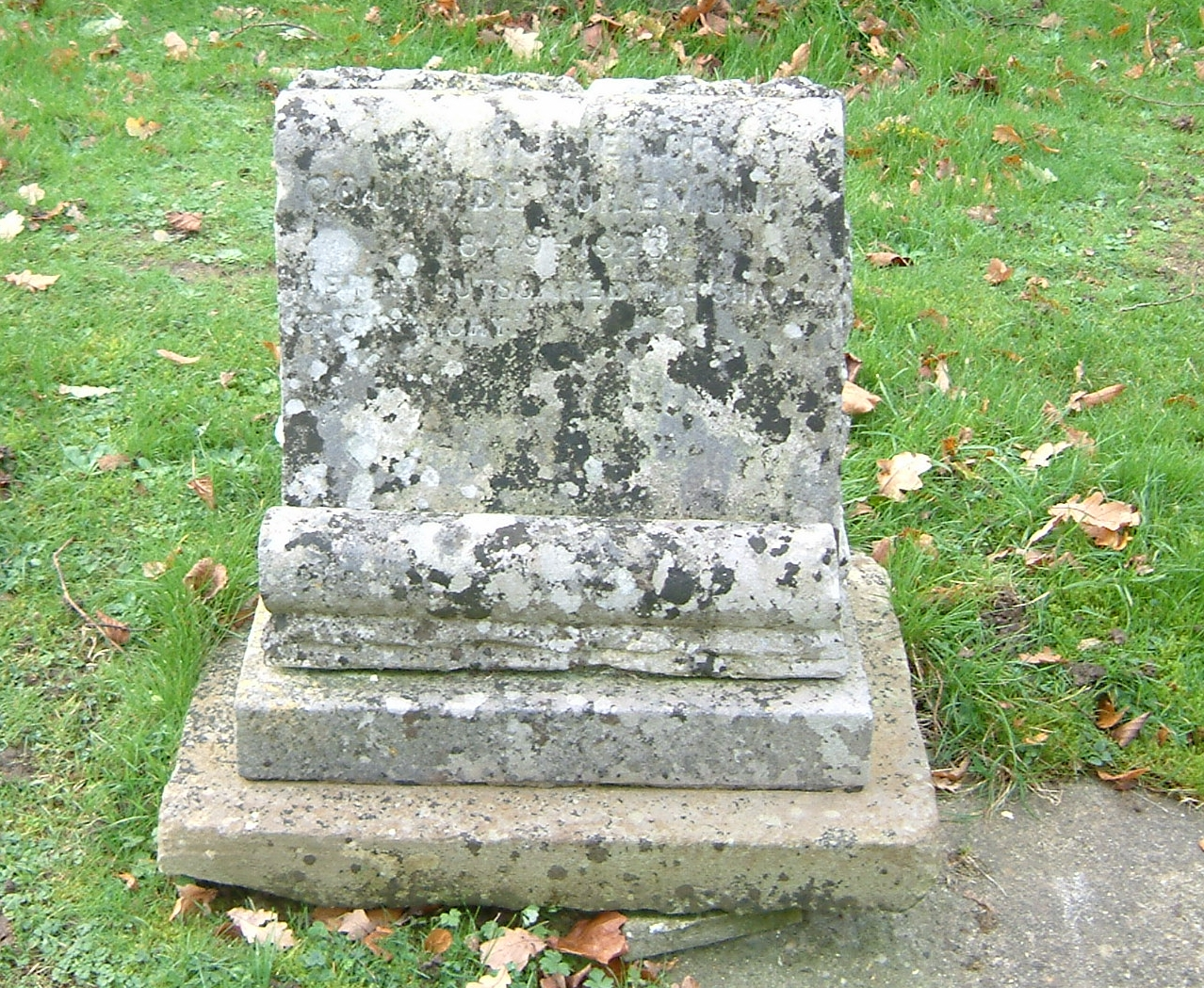
Headstone: buried under the alias of Count de Voilemont

=== Flight to Britain and later years ===
Esterhazy was discreetly put on military pension with the rank of Major. On 1 September 1898, having shaved off his moustache, he fled France, via Brussels, for the relative safety of England. Rachel Beer, editor of The Observer and the Sunday Times, English newspapers, knew that Esterhazy was in London because The Observer's Paris correspondent had made a connection with him, interviewing him twice, during which he confessed to being the culprit: I wrote the bordereau. She published the interviews in September 1898; reporting his confession and writing a leader column, she accused the French military of antisemitism and called for a retrial for Dreyfus.

From Milton Road in the town of Harpenden, Esterhazy continued to write in anti-Semitic papers such as La Libre Parole until his death in 1923. He is buried in St Nicholas's churchyard, Harpenden, under the name of Jean de Voilemont (the Forchtenstein branch of the Esterhazy family paid him at least 50,000 Francs to change his name). A headstone was erected shortly after with the false name and a false birthdate with an inscription from Percy Bysshe Shelley: "He has outsoared the shadow of our night".

=== Revisionist thesis: Esterhazy as double agent ===
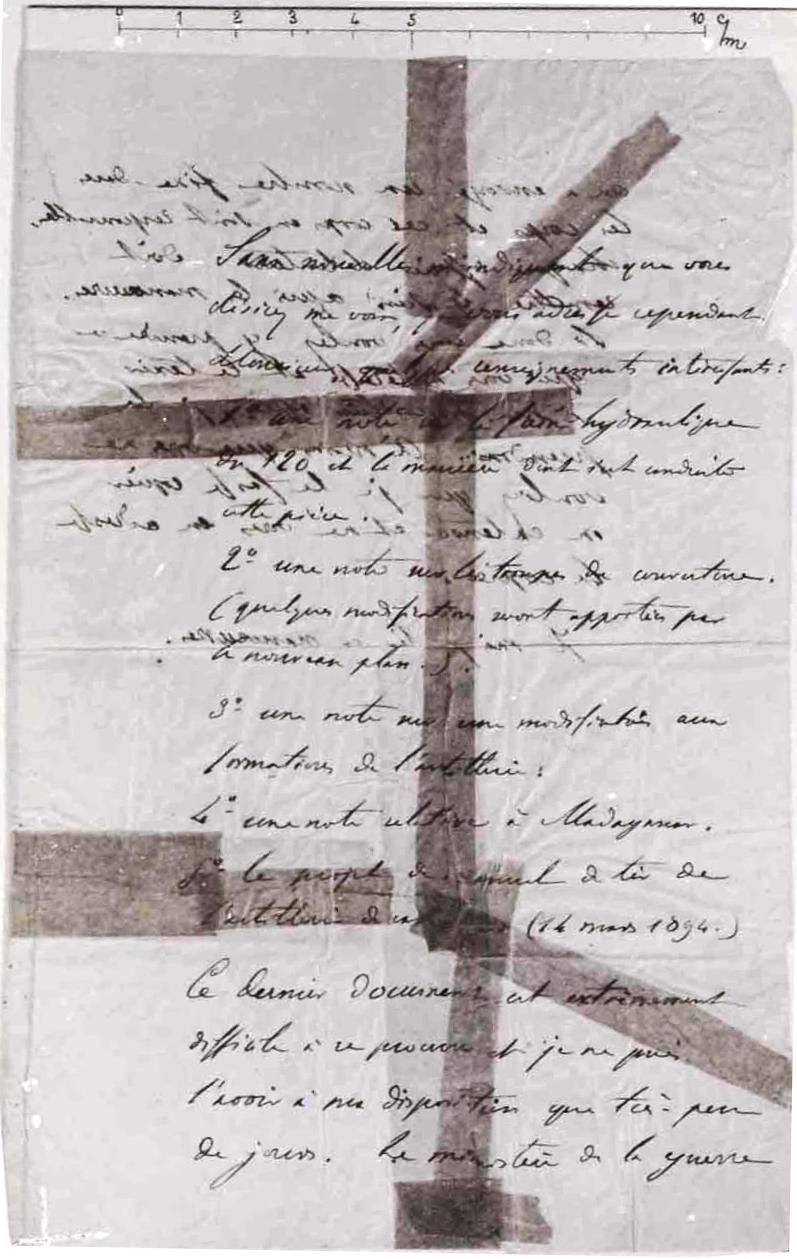
The bordereau (memorandum) which sparked the Dreyfus affair

French historian Jean Doise espoused the revisionist hypothesis that Esterhazy might have been a French double agent masquerading as a traitor in order to pass along misinformation to the German Army. Doise was not the first writer to explore the hypothesis of Esterhazy as a double agent: earlier writings by Michel de Lombarès and Henri Giscard d'Estaing, though they differed in the details of their theories, also presented this line of argument. According to Doise, Esterhazy's perceived bitterness and utter lack of patriotic feeling, along with his fluency in German, were qualities that would have helped him to pose as an effective and unrepentant traitor.

In Tunis, he was judged to have become too intimate with the German military attaché. In 1892, he was the object of an accusation made to the head of the staff, General Brault. In 1893, he entered (or, if one accepts the revisionist explanation, pretended to enter) the service of Maximilian von Schwartzkoppen, the German military attaché in Paris. According to later disclosures he received from the German attaché a monthly pension of 2000 marks (equivalent to over €12000 in 2015 terms). In return, Esterhazy furnished him in the first place with information (or, as argued, misinformation) about artillery.

Esterhazy reportedly got his information from Major Henry, who had been his comrade in the French military counter-intelligence section of the War Ministry, in 1876. However, Henry, limited to a very special branch of the service, was hardly in a position to furnish details on technical questions. The main architect of the disinformation campaign is claimed to have been Colonel Sandherr, head of French military counter-intelligence.

The lack of value of the material furnished by Esterhazy soon became so apparent that Alessandro Panizzardi, the Italian military attaché, to whom Schwartzkoppen communicated it without divulging the name of his informant, began to doubt his qualifications as an officer. To convince the attaché, it was necessary for Esterhazy to show himself one day in uniform, galloping behind a well-known general.

The infamous document, or bordereau, which was used to convict Dreyfus had been retrieved from a wastepaper basket at the German Embassy by a cleaning lady who was in the employ of French military counterintelligence. This document had been torn up but was easily pieced together. It announced, among other items, a forthcoming report on a new French 120mm howitzer Canon de 120C Modele 1890 Baquet and the comportment of its hydraulic recoil mechanism, as well as detailed manuals describing the current organization of French field artillery."

However, the French Army had already rejected the 120 mm model as unworkable and had begun development of the revolutionary (for its time) 75 mm field gun. The argument is this bordereau document was a supposed design to prevent the German military from discovering the development of the French 75.

However, there are reports of Esterhazy admitting that he had "indeed been a spy for Germany".
