= Alfred Dreyfus =

French Army officer (1859–1935)

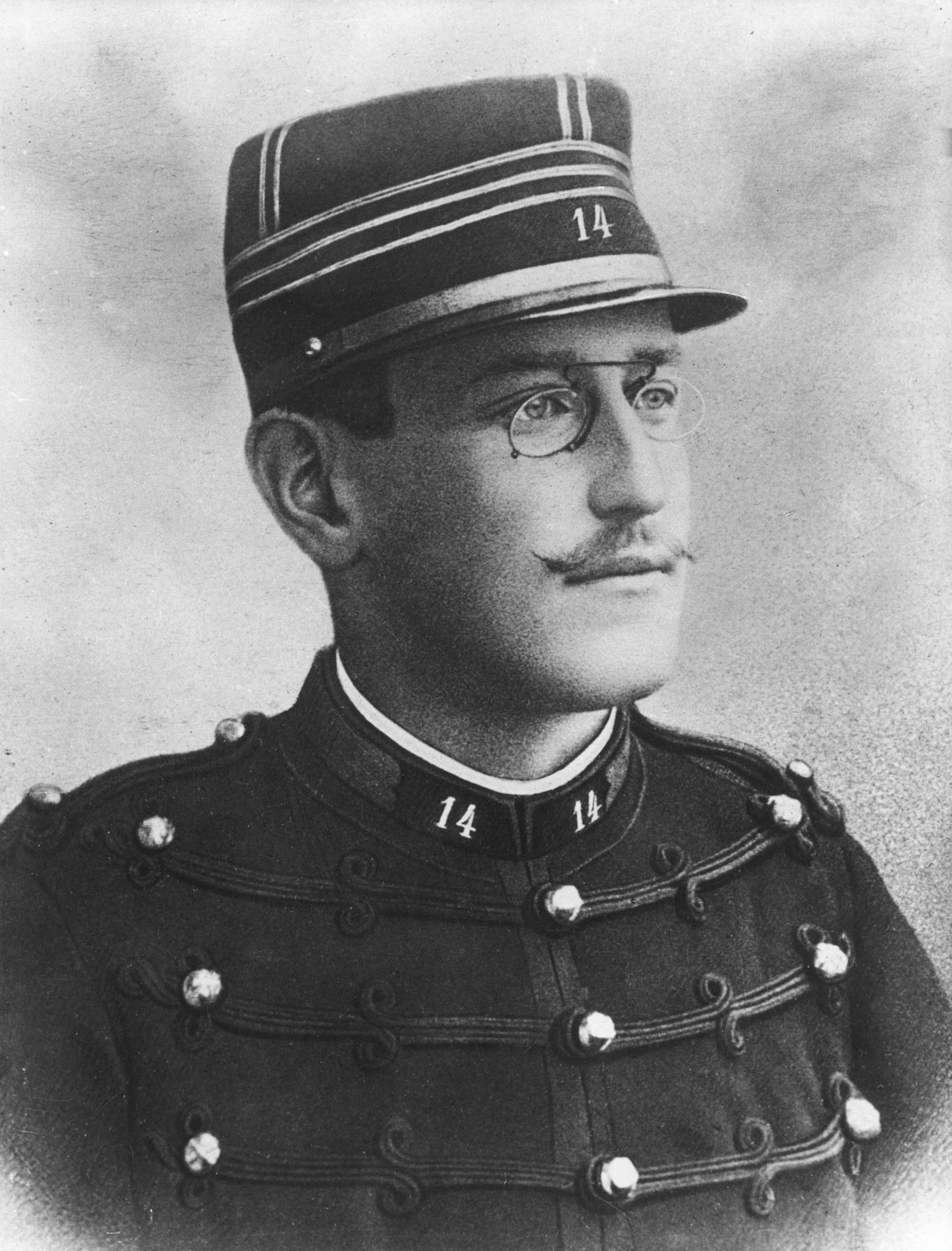
- Dreyfus c. 1894

Personal details
- Born: 9 October 1859 Mulhouse, France
- Died: 12 July 1935 (aged 75) Paris, France
- Resting place: Montparnasse Cemetery, Paris; 48°50′17″N 2°19′37″E
- Spouse: Lucie Eugénie Hadamard (m. 1890)
- Children: Pierre Dreyfus; Jeanne Dreyfus Levy
- Parents: Raphaël Dreyfus (father); Jeannette Libmann (mother)
- Education: École Polytechnique; École Supérieure de Guerre

Military service
- Allegiance: French Third Republic
- Branch/service: French Army
- Years of service: 1880–1918
- Rank: Lieutenant-Colonel (posthumously Brigadier-General)
- Unit: 31st Artillery Regiment; 1st Cavalry Division
- Battles/wars: World War I; Battle of Verdun; Second Battle of the Aisne

Alfred Dreyfus (Note: French: [alfʁɛd dʁɛfys], German: [ˈalfʁeːt ˈdʁaɪfuːs]) (9 October 1859 – 12 July 1935) was a French Army officer best known for his central role in the Dreyfus affair. In 1894, Dreyfus fell victim to a judicial conspiracy that eventually sparked a major political crisis in the French Third Republic when he was wrongfully accused and convicted of being a German spy due to antisemitism. Dreyfus was arrested, cashiered from the French army and imprisoned on Devil's Island in French Guiana. Eventually, evidence emerged showing that Dreyfus was innocent and the true culprit was fellow officer Ferdinand Walsin Esterhazy.

Gradual revelations indicated that the internal investigation conducted by the French army was biased; Dreyfus was an ideal scapegoat due to being a Jew, and military authorities were aware of his innocence but chose to cover up the affair and leave him imprisoned rather than lose face. A political scandal subsequently erupted, shaking French political life and highlighting antisemitism in the French army and government. After numerous judicial and political developments, the publication of Émile Zola's manifesto J'Accuse...! in 1898 brought new momentum to Dreyfus' cause. Zola accused French military and political leadership of covering up the affair. Dreyfus was eventually exonerated, rehabilitated and reinstated in the French army, although at a lower rank than his seniority would have warranted.

"Anti-Dreyfusards" and antisemites in France, however, viewed even his rehabilitation unfavorably, and while attending the transfer of Zola's remains to the Panthéon, Dreyfus was the target of an unsuccessful assassination attempt by an antisemitic militarist who was later acquitted at trial. Dreyfus later fought in World War I, notably at the battles of Verdun and the Aisne, before retiring and leading a quiet life. He died in 1935 in Paris and was buried in the Montparnasse Cemetery. Dreyfus' life and the antisemitic persecutions he endured left a significant mark on French political consciousness, while Esterhazy remained unpunished until his death. Among Dreyfus's defenders were writers such as Zola, Charles Péguy, and Anatole France, politicians such as Georges Clemenceau and Jean Jaurès, filmmakers such as Georges Méliès, and the founders of the Human Rights League (LDH) Francis de Pressensé and Pierre Quillard.

== Early life, family, and education ==
Born in Mulhouse, Alsace on 9 October 1859, to Raphaël and Jeannette Dreyfus (née Libmann), Alfred Dreyfus was the youngest of nine children (seven of whom survived to adulthood). His grandfather was a merchant from a long established Alsatian Jewish family in Rixheim, not far from Mulhouse. His father became a prosperous industrialist who started a cotton mill, then expanded the business with a weaving factory. This enabled the Dreyfus family to live a comfortable and affluent life within Mulhouse society. He spent his first years in a house on Rue du Sauvage, then later in a mansion on Rue de la Sinne, both in Mulhouse.

Due to his mother's bedridden illness following his birth, his sister Henriette became like a second mother to him. Alfred was 10 years old when the Franco-Prussian War broke out in the summer of 1870, and following the annexation of Alsace-Lorraine by Germany after the war, he and his family moved to Basel, Switzerland, where he attended high school. The family later relocated to Paris.

== Early career ==
The childhood experience of seeing his family uprooted by the war with Germany prompted Dreyfus to decide on a career in the military. Following his 18th birthday in October 1877, he enrolled in the elite École Polytechnique military school in Paris, where he received military training and an education in the sciences. In 1880, he graduated and was commissioned as a sub-lieutenant in the French army. From 1880 to 1882, he attended the artillery school at Fontainebleau to receive more specialized training as an artillery officer. On graduation, he was assigned to the 31st Artillery Regiment, which was in the garrison at Le Mans. Dreyfus was subsequently transferred to a mounted artillery battery attached to the First Cavalry Division (Paris), and promoted to lieutenant in 1885. In 1889, he was made adjutant to the director of the Établissement de Bourges, a government arsenal, and promoted to captain.

On 18 April 1891, the 31-year-old Dreyfus married 20-year-old Lucie Eugénie Hadamard (1870–1945). They had two children, Pierre (1891–1946) and Jeanne (1893–1981). Three days after the wedding, Dreyfus learned that he had been admitted to the École Supérieure de Guerre or War College. Two years later, he graduated ninth in his class with honourable mention and was immediately designated as a trainee in the French Army's General Staff headquarters, where he would be the only Jewish officer. His father Raphaël died on 13 December 1893.

At the War College examination in 1892, his friends had expected him to do well. However, one of the members of the panel, General Bonnefond, felt that "Jews were not desired" on the staff, and gave Dreyfus poor marks for cote d'amour (French slang: attraction; translatable as likability). Bonnefond's assessment lowered Dreyfus' overall grade; he did the same to another Jewish candidate, Lieutenant Picard. Learning of this injustice, the two officers lodged a protest with the director of the school, General Lebelin de Dionne, who expressed his regret for what had occurred, but said he was powerless to take any steps in the matter. The protest would later count against Dreyfus. The French army of the period was relatively open to entry and advancement by talent, with an estimated 300 Jewish officers, of whom ten were generals. However, within the Fourth Bureau of the General Staff, General Bonnefond's prejudices appear to have been shared by some of Dreyfus's superiors. The personal assessments he received during 1893/94 acknowledged his high intelligence, but were critical of aspects of his personality.

== The Dreyfus affair ==
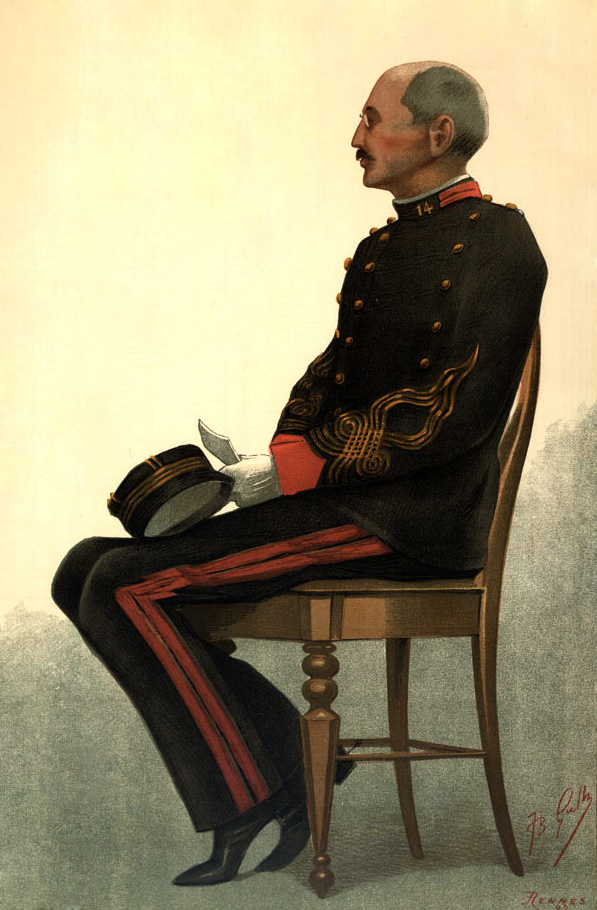
An 1899 painting of Dreyfus by Jean Baptiste Guth published in Vanity Fair

A torn-up handwritten note, referred to throughout the affair as the bordereau, was found by a French housekeeper, a woman named Marie Bastian, in a wastebasket at the German Embassy. Bastian, whose job was to burn the waste of Maximilian von Schwartzkoppen, instead sent it to Hubert-Joseph Henry for potential interest to French intelligence. The bordereau described a minor French military secret, and had obviously been written by a spy in the French military.

In 1894, this made the French Army's counter-intelligence section, led by Lieutenant Colonel Jean Sandherr, aware that information regarding new artillery parts was being passed to Maximilian von Schwartzkoppen, the German military attaché in Paris, by a highly placed spy most likely on the General Staff. Suspicion quickly fell upon Dreyfus, who was arrested for treason on 15 October 1894.

On 22 December 1894, Dreyfus was summarily convicted in a closed court martial and sentenced to life imprisonment which was to be served on Devil's Island in French Guiana. Following French military custom of the time, on 5 January 1895 Dreyfus was formally degraded (cashiered) by having the rank insignia, buttons and braid cut from his uniform and his sword broken, all in the courtyard of the École Militaire before silent ranks of soldiers, while a large crowd of onlookers shouted abuse from behind railings. Dreyfus cried out: "I swear that I am innocent. I remain worthy of serving in the Army. Long live France! Long live the Army!"

In August 1896, the new chief of French military intelligence, Lieutenant Colonel Georges Picquart, reported to his superiors that he had found evidence to the effect that the real traitor was the Major Ferdinand Walsin Esterhazy. Picquart was silenced by being transferred to command a tirailleur regiment based in Sousse, Tunisia, in November 1896. When reports of an army cover-up and Dreyfus' possible innocence were leaked to the press, a heated debate ensued about antisemitism and France's identity as a Catholic nation or a republic founded on equal rights for all citizens.

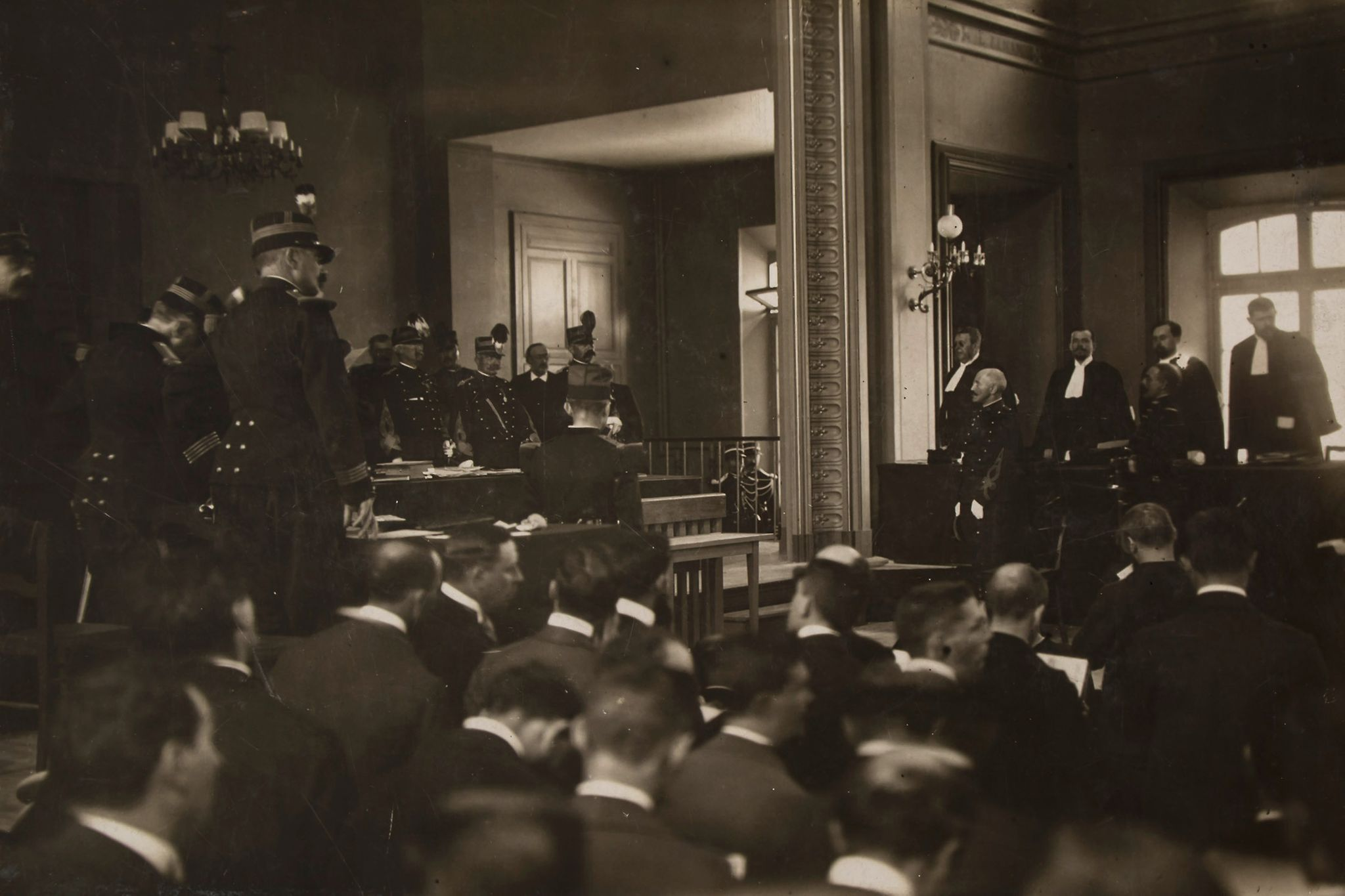
Trial opening session in Rennes

Esterhazy was found not guilty by a secret court martial, before fleeing secretly to England and shaving off his moustache. Rachel Beer, editor of The Observer and the Sunday Times, interviewed him twice. He confessed to writing the bordereau under orders from Sandherr in an attempt to frame Dreyfus. She wrote about her interviews in September 1898, reporting his confession and writing a leader column accusing the French military of antisemitism and calling for a retrial for Dreyfus.

In France there was a passionate campaign by Dreyfus' supporters, including leading artists and intellectuals such as Émile Zola, following which he was given a second trial in 1899, but again declared guilty of treason despite the evidence of his innocence.

However, due to public opinion, Dreyfus was offered and accepted a pardon by President Émile Loubet in 1899 and released from prison; this was a compromise that saved face for the military's mistake. Had Dreyfus refused the pardon, he would have been returned to Devil's Island, a fate he could no longer emotionally cope with; so officially Dreyfus remained a traitor to France, and pointedly remarked upon his release:

The government of the Republic has given me back my freedom. It is nothing for me without my honour.

Until July 1906, he lived in a state of house arrest with one of his sisters at Carpentras, and later at Cologny.

On 12 July 1906, Dreyfus was officially exonerated by a military commission. The day after his exoneration, he was readmitted into the army with a promotion to the rank of major (Chef d'Escadron). A week later, he was made Knight of the Legion of Honour, and subsequently assigned to command an artillery unit at Vincennes. On 15 October 1906, he was placed in command of another artillery unit at Saint-Denis.

== Aftermath ==
While attending a ceremony relocating Zola's ashes to the Panthéon on 4 June 1908, Dreyfus was wounded in the arm by a gunshot from a right-wing journalist, Louis Grégori, who was trying to assassinate him. Grégori was acquitted by the Parisian court, which accepted his defence that he had not meant to kill Dreyfus, meaning merely to graze him.

In 1937, Dreyfus' son Pierre published his father's memoirs based on his correspondence between 1899 and 1906. The memoirs were titled Souvenirs et Correspondance and translated into English, as Dreyfus: His Life and Letters, by Betty Morgan.

Dreyfus started corresponding with the marquise Marie-Louise Arconati-Visconti in 1899 and began attending her Thursday (political) salons after his release. They continued their correspondence until her death in 1923.

== Later life ==
=== World War I ===
Dreyfus' prison sentence on Devil's Island had taken its toll on his health. He was granted retirement from the army in October 1907 at the age of 48. As a reserve officer, he re-entered the army as a major of artillery at the outbreak of World War I. Serving throughout the war, Dreyfus was promoted to the rank of lieutenant colonel.

By then in his mid-50s, Dreyfus served mostly behind the lines of the Western Front, in part as commander of an artillery supply column. However, he also performed front-line duties in 1917, notably at Verdun and on the Chemin des Dames. He was promoted to Officer of the Legion of Honour in November 1918.

Dreyfus' son Pierre also served throughout the entire war as an artillery officer, receiving the Croix de guerre.

=== Death ===
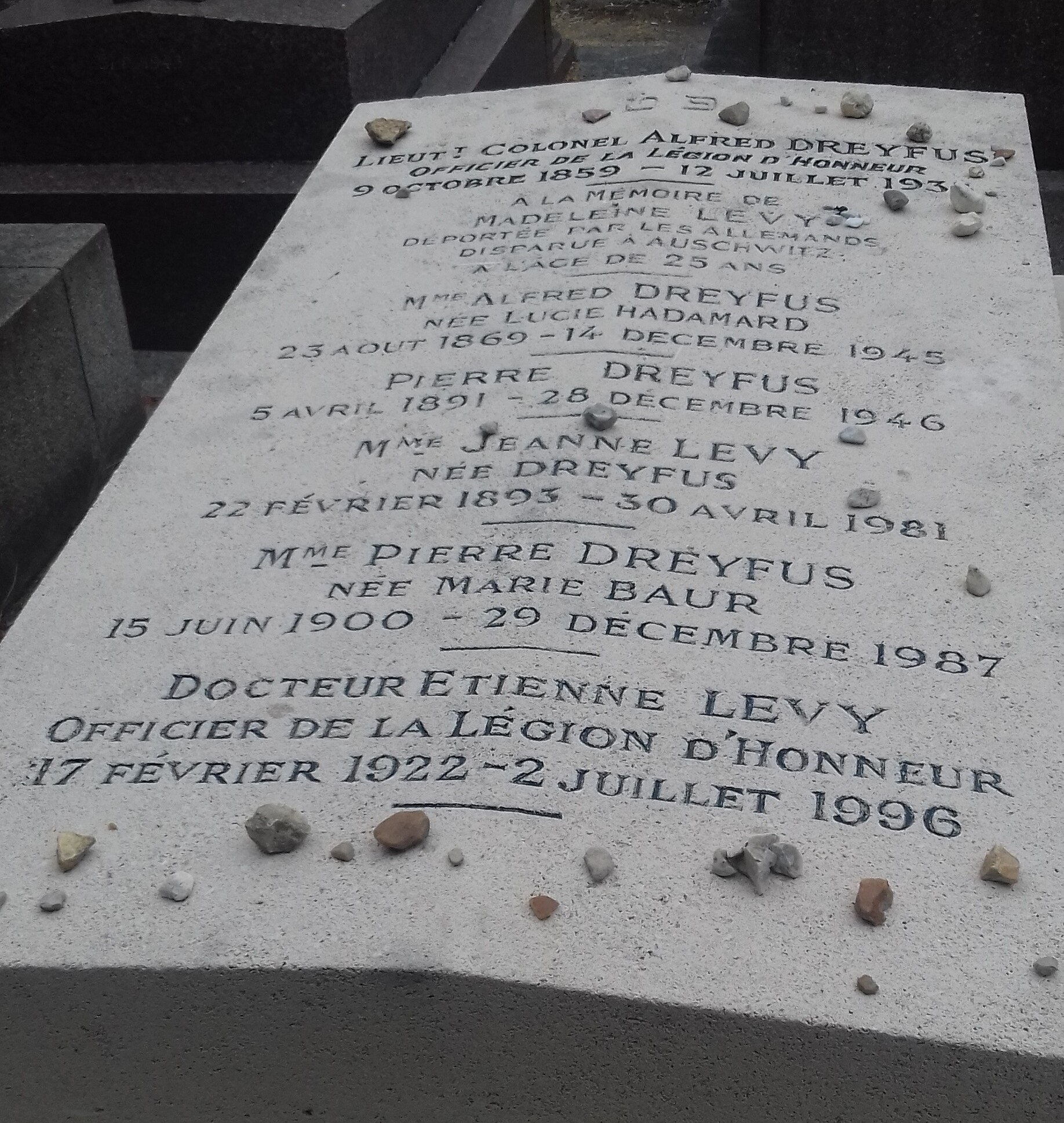
Grave of Alfred Dreyfus

Dreyfus died in Paris aged 75, on 12 July 1935. Two days later, his funeral cortège passed the Place de la Concorde through the ranks of troops assembled for the Bastille Day national holiday. He was interred in the Cimetière du Montparnasse, Paris.

A statue of Dreyfus holding his broken sword is located at Boulevard Raspail, nº116–118, at the exit of the Notre-Dame-des-Champs metro station. A duplicate statue stands in the courtyard of the Museum of Jewish Art and History in Paris.

During the German occupation of France during WWII, Lucie Dreyfus, who had played a major role in the fight to exonerate her husband, was hidden in a convent in Valence. Their son, Pierre Léon Dreyfus (1891–1946), escaped to the United States in 1943. Their daughter, Jeanne Dreyfus Lévy (1893–1981), also survived, but granddaughter Madeleine Levy, arrested by French police in Toulouse, was deported and died of typhus in Auschwitz in January 1944, aged 25.

== Modern aftermath ==
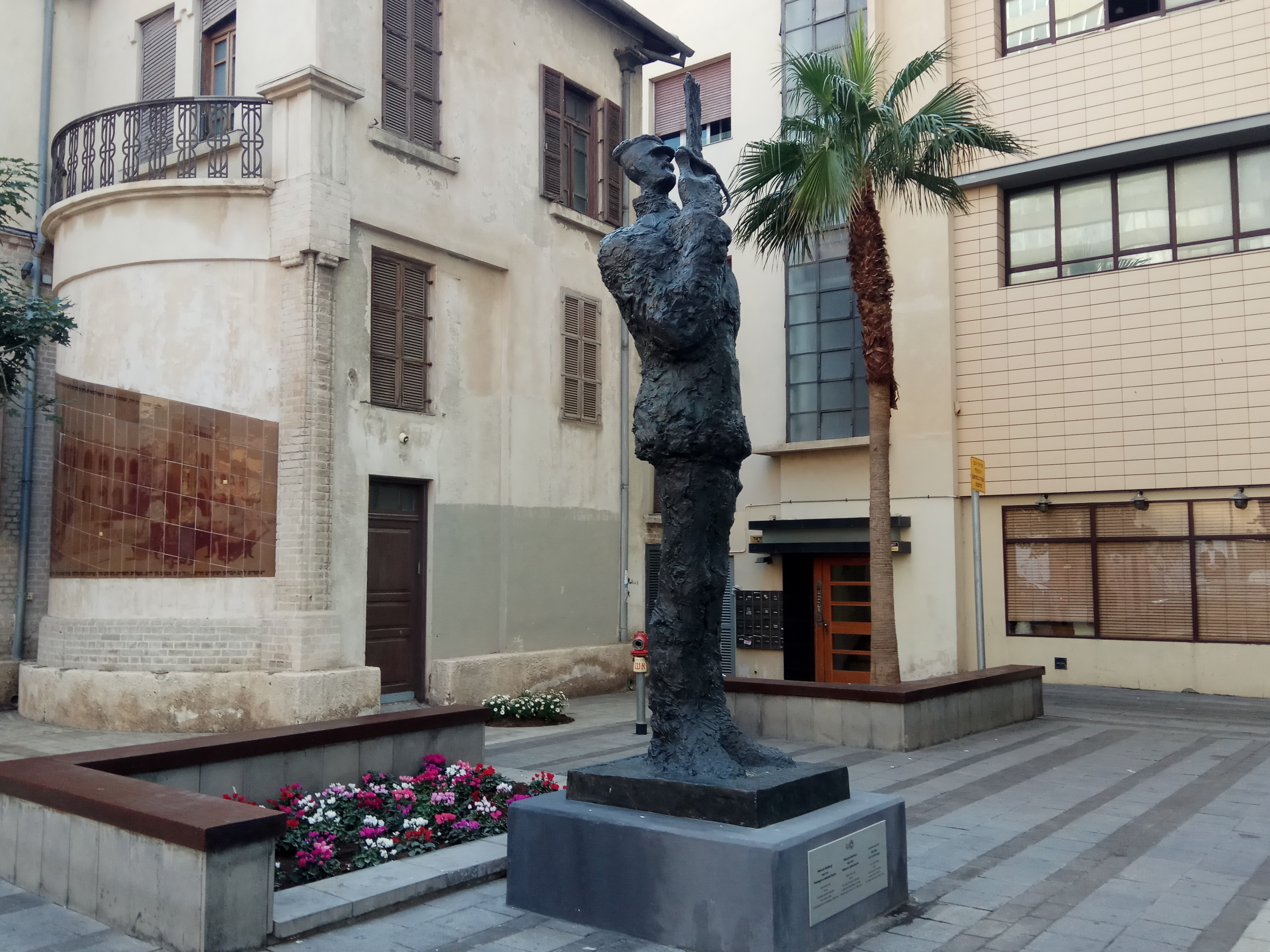
A sculpture of Alfred Dreyfus in Tel Aviv

In October 2021, French president Emmanuel Macron inaugurated a museum dedicated to the Dreyfus affair in Médan in the northwestern suburbs of Paris. He said that nothing could repair the humiliations and injustices Dreyfus had suffered, and "let us not aggravate it by forgetting, deepening, or repeating them".

The reference to not repeating them follows attempts by the French far right to question Dreyfus' innocence. An army colonel was cashiered in 1994 for publishing an article suggesting that Dreyfus was guilty; far-right politician Jean-Marie Le Pen's lawyer responded that Dreyfus' exoneration was "contrary to all known jurisprudence". Éric Zemmour, a far-right political opponent of Macron, said repeatedly in 2021 that the truth about Dreyfus was not clear; his innocence was "not obvious".

Dreyfus had been promoted to major when he was exonerated in 1906, a lower rank than was justified by his seniority, and to lieutenant colonel in 1916. In 2025, the National Assembly finally unanimously backed a symbolic effort to promote him posthumously to brigadier general as an act of reparation, subject to confirmation by the Senate. The promotion was finalized by President Emmanuel Macron on 17 November 2025.

== Legacy ==
Dreyfus' grandchildren donated over three thousand documents to the Musée d'Art et d'Histoire du Judaïsme (Museum of Jewish Art and History), including personal letters, photographs of the trial, legal documents, writings by Dreyfus during his time in prison, personal family photographs, and his officer stripes that had been ripped off as a symbol of treason. The museum created an online platform in 2006 dedicated to the Dreyfus Affair.

== Military ranks ==
Ranks attained in the French Army
Student	Sous-lieutenant	Lieutenant	Capitaine	Chef d'escadrons	Lieutenant-colonel	Général de brigade
1 October 1878	4 October 1880	1 November 1882	12 September 1889	13 July 1906	26 September 1918	18 November 2025

== Honours, decorations and commemorations ==
=== National honours ===
Ribbon bar	Honour
	Knight of the National Order of the Legion of Honour – 21 July 1906
	Officer of the National Order of the Legion of Honour – 21 January 1919

=== Decorations and medals ===
Ribbon bar	Honour
	War Cross 1914–1918
	1914–1918 Commemorative war medal

== Images of Dreyfus from different time periods ==
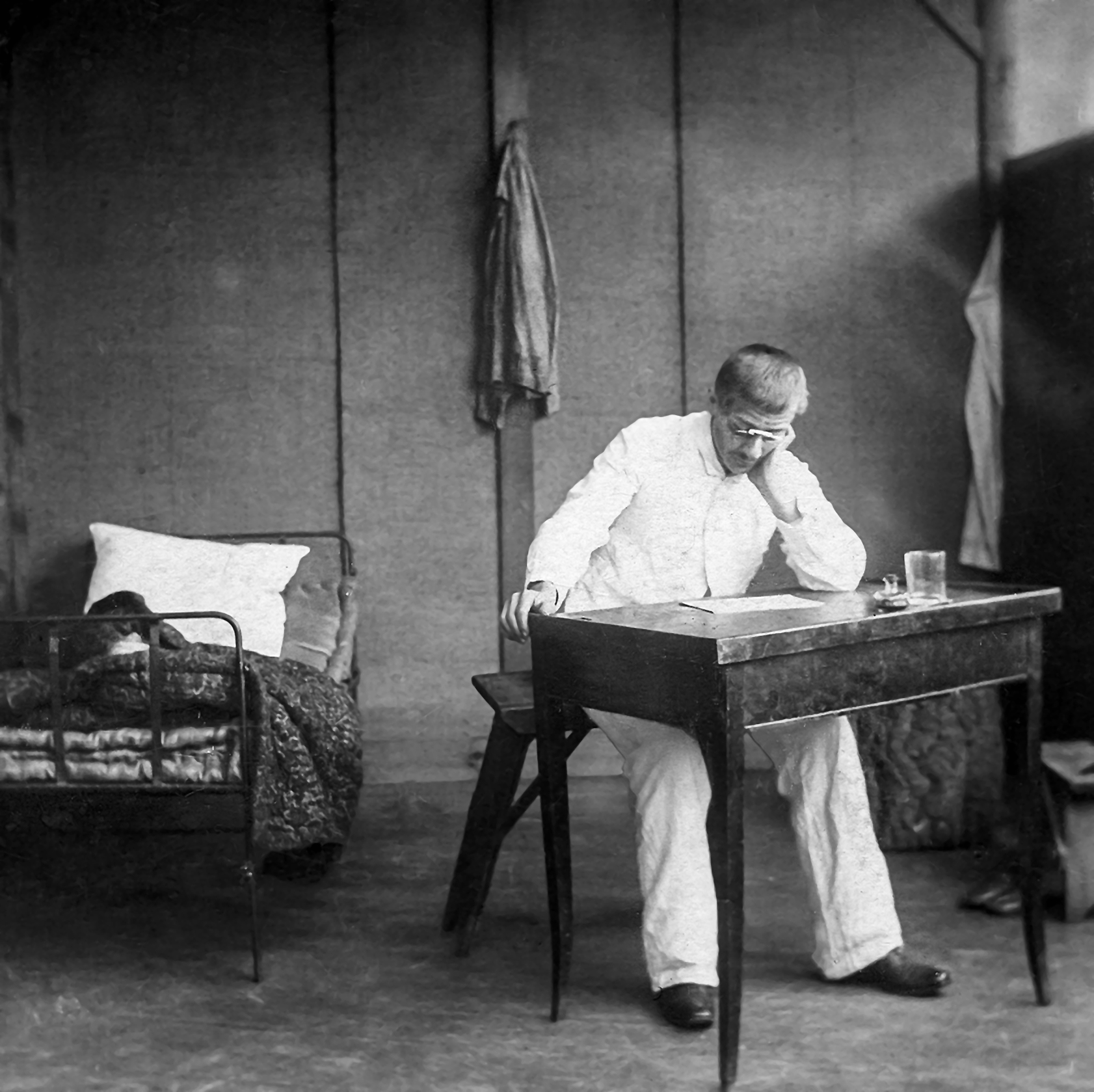
An 1898 photo of Dreyfus in captivity at Devil's Island

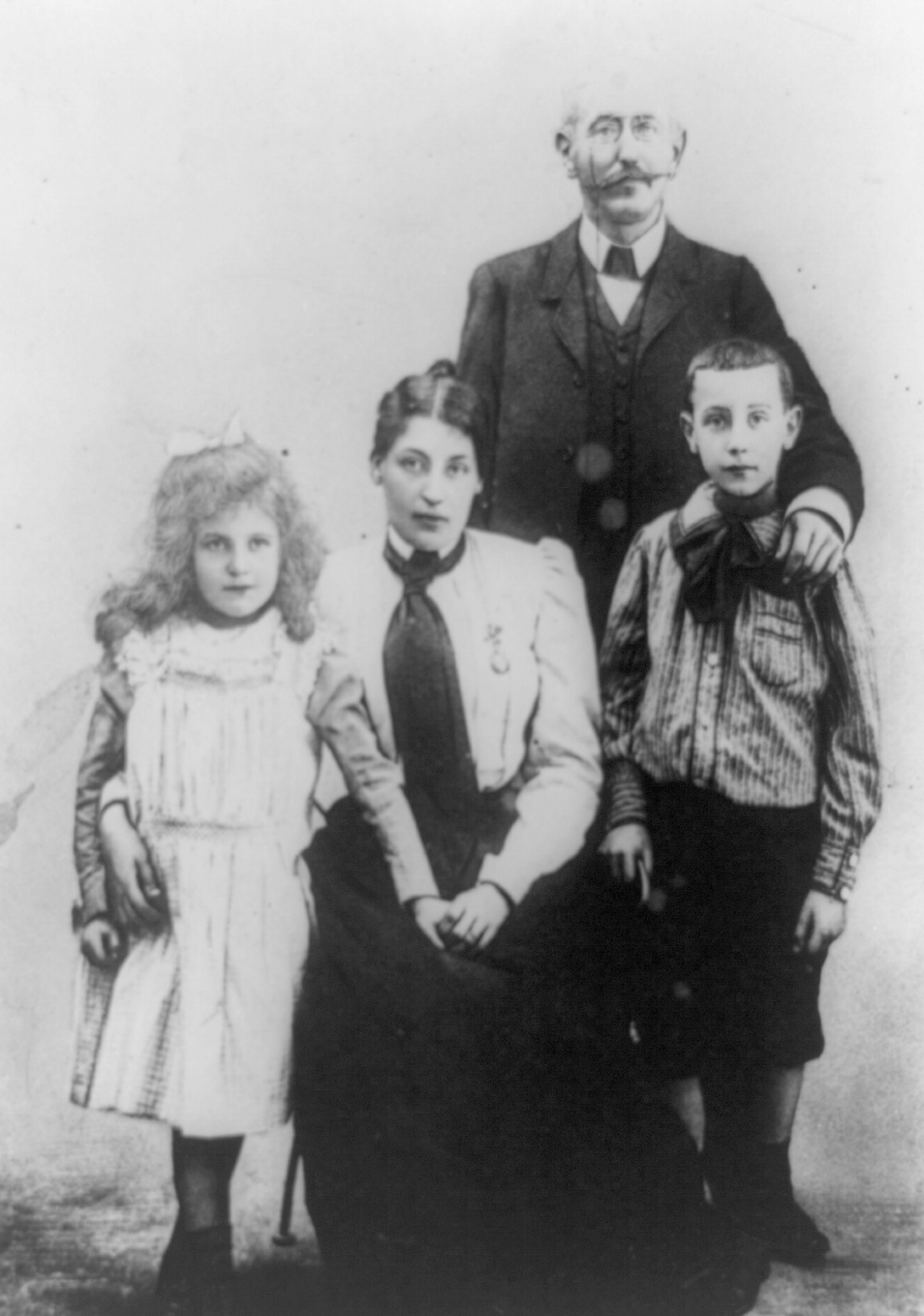
A 1905 photo of the Dreyfus family

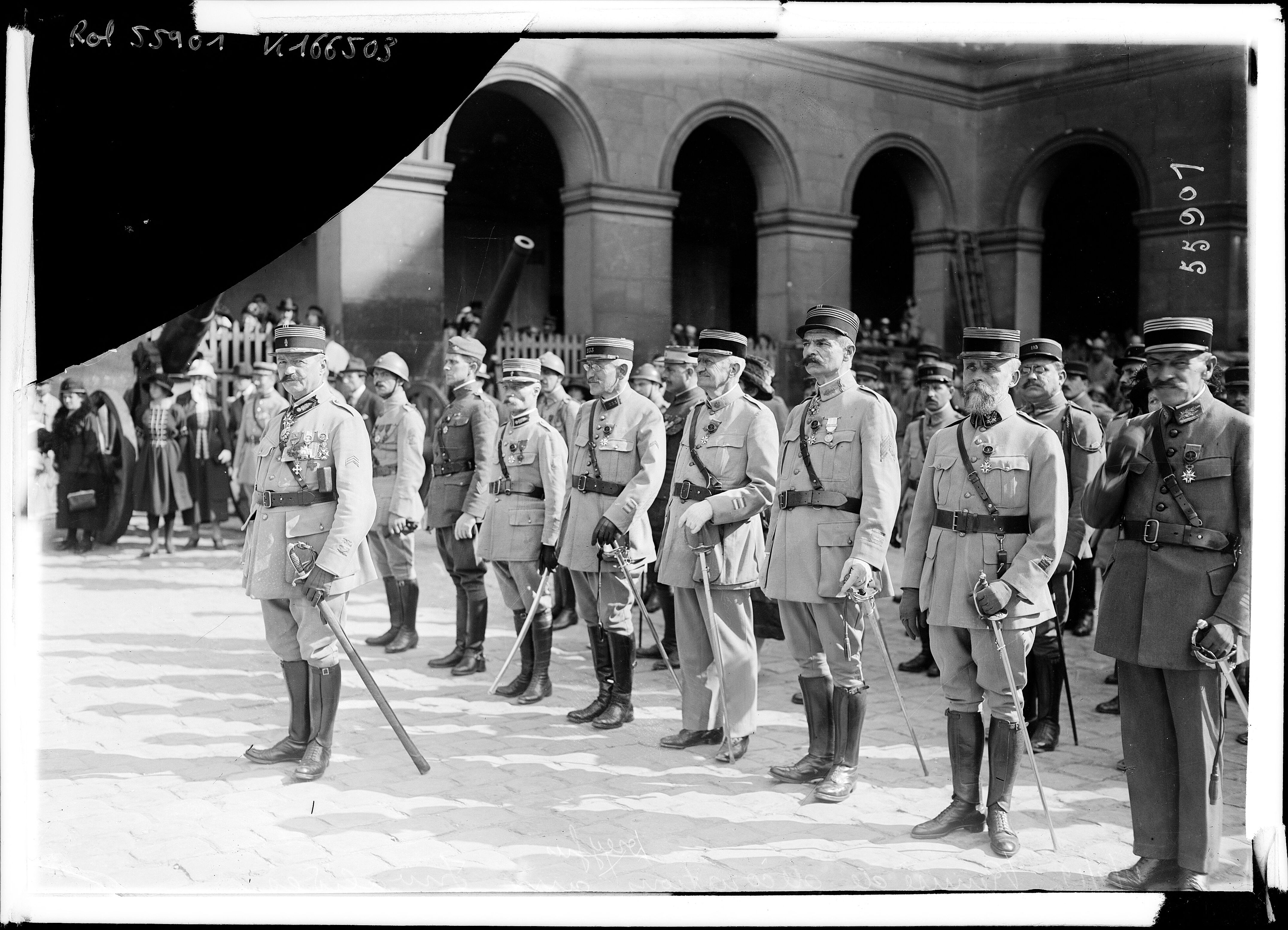
Dreyfus (5th from right) in 1919

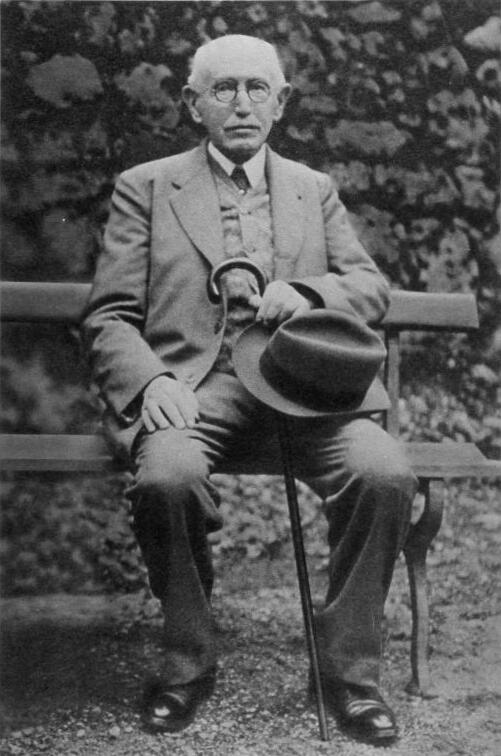
Alfred Dreyfus, ca. 1930

== See also ==
- Florence Earle Coates, a Philadelphia poet, wrote four poems about the Dreyfus affair: two entitled "Dreyfus", one published in 1898 and the other in 1899, "Picquart" (1902), and "Le Grand Salut" (1906)
- J'Accuse…!, influential 1898 open letter written by Émile Zola
- Theodor Herzl, Austrian journalist who began the Zionist movement after seeing the antisemitism present in Dreyfus' trial
- Gaston Moch, a defense supporter of Dreyfus
- Charles Péguy, who wrote a defense of Dreyfus
- George Whyte, an authority on the Dreyfus affair who has authored a large body of literary and stage works on Dreyfus and the Dreyfus affair
- The Dreyfus Affair (film series), an 1899 series of short silent docudramas
- The Prisoner of the Devil, a novel by Michael Hardwick which features Sherlock Holmes called in to solve the case
- An Officer and a Spy, a novel written in first person by Robert Harris, in the form of an account of the Dreyfus Affair as if written by Georges Picquart
- The Life of Emile Zola, a 1937 film starring Joseph Schildkraut as Dreyfus, who won an Academy Award for Best Supporting Actor for his performance
- I Accuse!, a 1958 film starring José Ferrer as Dreyfus
- An Officer and a Spy, film by Roman Polanski (2019)

== Bibliography ==
=== Secondary sources ===
- Burns, Michael (1991). Dreyfus: A Family Affair, 1789–1945. HarperCollins. ISBN 978-0-06-016366-2.
- Samuels, Maurice (2024). Alfred Dreyfus: The Man at the Center of the Affair. Yale University Press. ISBN 978-0-300-25400-6.

=== Primary sources ===
- Lettres d'un innocent [Letters from an innocent man] (in French). 1898.
- Letters from Captain Dreyfus to his wife (in French). 1899. – written at Devil's Island
- Cinq années de ma vie (in French). 1901.
  - Five years of my life. Comino. 2019. ISBN 978-3-945831-19-9. – translation of Cinq années de ma vie
- Souvenirs et correspondence. 1936. – published posthumously
