= Georges Picquart =

French Minister of War (1854-1914)

Marie-Georges Picquart
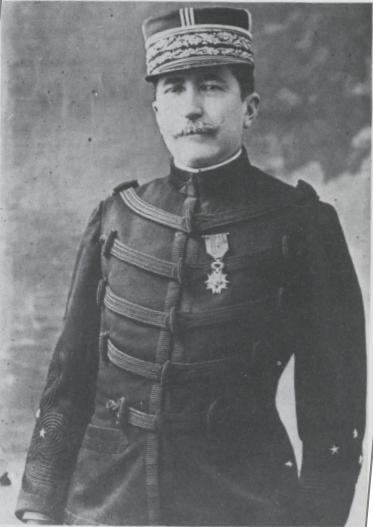
- Georges Picquart in the uniform of General of Division
- Born: 6 September 1854; Strasbourg, France
- Died: 19 January 1914 (aged 59); Amiens, France
- Burial place: Cimetière Saint-Urbain; Strasbourg, France
- Military career
- Allegiance: France
- Branch: French Army
- Service years: 1872–1902, 1906–1914
- Rank: Général de division
- Commands: 2e Corps d'Armée
- Other work: Minister of War (1906–1909)

Minister of War of France
- In office 25 October 1906 – 24 July 1909
- President: Armand Fallières
- Prime Minister: Georges Clemenceau
- Preceded by: Eugène Étienne
- Succeeded by: Jean Brun

Marie-Georges Picquart (French: [ʒɔʁʒ pikaʁ]; 6 September 1854 – 19 January 1914) was a French Army officer and Minister of War. He is best known for his role in the Dreyfus affair, in which he played a key role in uncovering the real culprit.

== Early career ==
Picquart was born in Strasbourg. He began his military career in 1872, graduating from the École spéciale militaire de Saint-Cyr as fifth in his year. Picquart served as an infantry officer in France before undertaking staff duties in Indochina. He saw service with the 4th Zouaves in Algeria as well as with several regiments of line infantry and chasseurs à pied (light infantry) in Metropolitan France. He subsequently studied at the General Staff Academy (École d'état-major) where he was second in his class, after which he became a lecturer at the War Academy (École supérieure de guerre). One of his students at the latter institute was Alfred Dreyfus.

== Picquart and the Dreyfus affair ==
Picquart was then appointed to the General Staff in Paris. As a staff officer he acted as reporter of the debates in the first Dreyfus court-martial for the then Minister of War, Auguste Mercier, and the Chief of the Army General Staff, Raoul Le Mouton de Boisdeffre. Picquart was subsequently promoted to the rank of lieutenant-colonel on 6 April 1896.

He was appointed chief of the army's intelligence section (Deuxième Bureau, service de renseignement militaire) in 1895. The following year Picquart discovered that the memorandum ("bordereau") used to convict Captain Alfred Dreyfus had actually been the work of Major Ferdinand Walsin Esterhazy. Several high-ranking generals warned Picquart to conceal his discovery, but Picquart continued his investigation. In this he was hindered and sabotaged by subordinate officers, notably Major Hubert-Joseph Henry. As a consequence, Picquart was relieved of his appointment with the Deuxième Bureau, returning in December 1896 to regimental duty in Africa, commanding the 4th Tunisian Tirailleurs Regiment (native infantry) based at Sousse in French Tunisia.

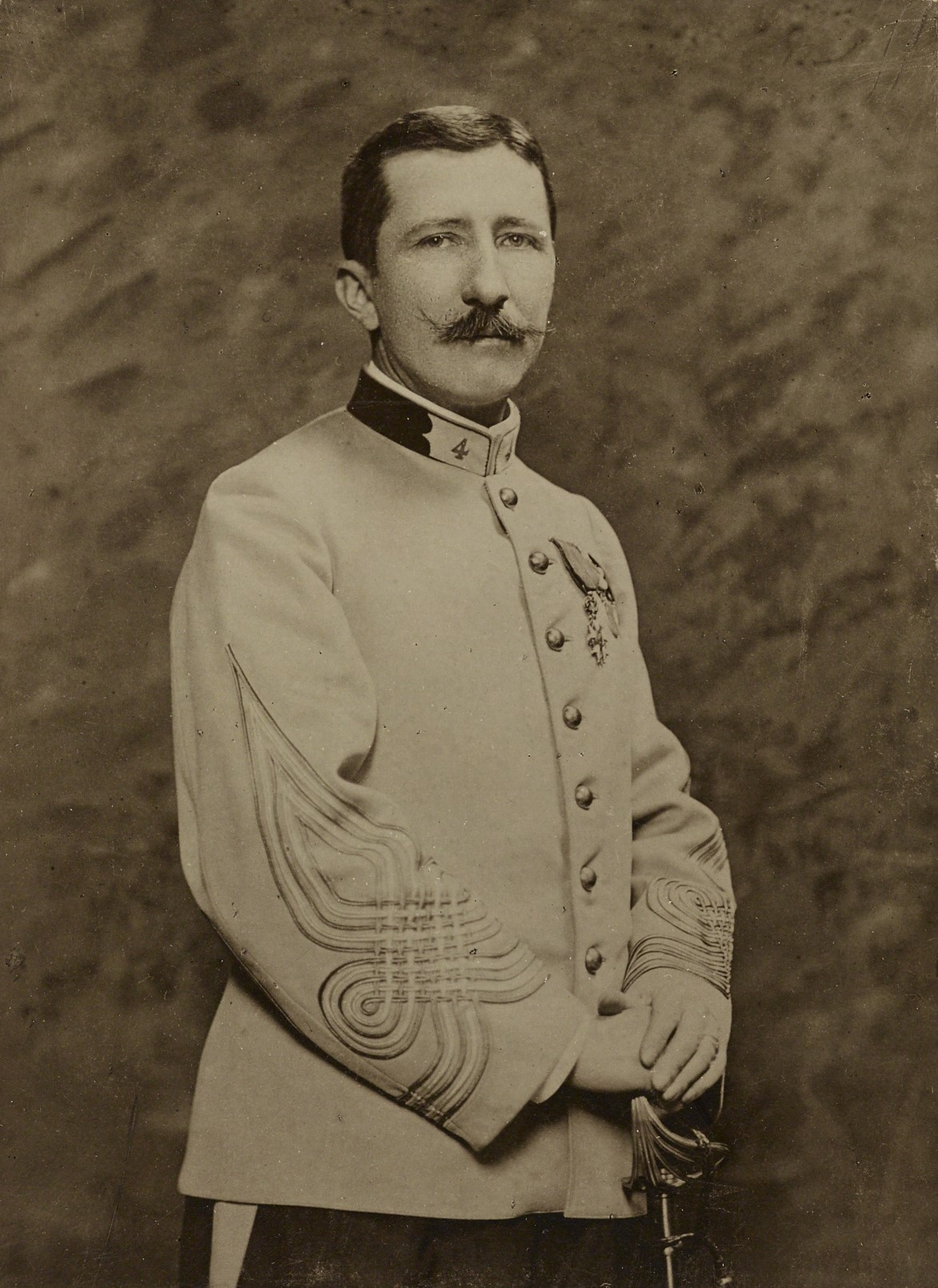
Lieutenant Colonel Georges Picquart as commander of the 4th Tunisian Tirailleurs

After the trial of Émile Zola for publishing his 1898 open letter J'Accuse…!, Picquart was himself accused of forging the note that had convinced him of Esterhazy's guilt. He was then arrested for forgery and was waiting for a court-martial, while the French Court of Cassation was reviewing the Dreyfus case. After the second court-martial, held as a consequence of the conclusions of the court, Picquart resigned from the army. However, the exoneration of Dreyfus in 1906 also absolved Picquart, who was, by an act of the French Chamber of Deputies, promoted to brigadier general. That was the rank that an officer of his seniority and experience could normally have expected to reach, if his career had not been interrupted by his involvement in the Dreyfus affair.

== Subsequent career ==
In 1906, Picquart entered Georges Clemenceau's first cabinet as Minister of War. He held that position for the entire duration of the Clemenceau Cabinet, from 25 October 1906 to 24 July 1909. Picquart then returned to military service as an Army Corps commander.

== Private life ==
A keen amateur pianist, Picquart was a regular visitor to the Chaigneau family, whose daughters formed the Trio Chaigneau. He later helped arrange concerts for them.

Picquart was raised in an ardent Catholic family, but later left religion and became an agnostic.

== Death ==
While still a serving army officer, Picquart died on 19 January 1914 in Amiens from injuries sustained in a fall from a horse while he was riding in Picardy. He was 59.

== In popular culture ==
Richard Dreyfuss portrayed Picquart in the 1991 made-for-cable drama Prisoner of Honor, directed by Ken Russell which chronicled the Dreyfus Affair. The 2013 novel An Officer and a Spy and the 2019 film adapted from it tell the story of the Dreyfus affair from Picquart's perspective. He is portrayed in the film by Jean Dujardin.

== See also ==
- List of War Ministers of France
- Picquart's investigations of the Dreyfus Affair
- "Picquart", a poem by Florence Earle Coates

Political offices
Preceded by Eugène Étienne	Minister of War of France; 1906–1909	Succeeded by Jean Brun
