= Georges Picquart's investigations of the Dreyfus affair =

While Alfred Dreyfus was serving his sentence on Devil's Island, in France a number of people began to question his guilt. The most notable of these was Major Georges Picquart.

== Colonel Picquart ==
Not long after the condemnation of Alfred Dreyfus, the military counter-intelligence section at the French War Ministry had a change of leadership. Lt Col Jean Conrad Sandherr, incapacitated by illness, resigned from the post simultaneously with his assistant, Cordier on 1 July 1895. Georges Picquart, who had been in charge of reporting the proceedings of the Dreyfus case to the War Minister and to his chief of staff, received the appointment to fill Sandherr's position. Picquart was a young and brilliant officer, of Alsatian origin, hard-working and well-informed, with a clear intellect. He had been promoted to the rank of lieutenant-colonel on 6 April 1896, the youngest officer of that grade in the army.

Immediately upon his arrival, he reorganized the service, which had been neglected during the prolonged illness of Sandherr. He required that the paper bags Madame Marie Bastian used to collect the waste papers from the German embassy (which she had previously brought to Major Henry) to pass through his hands before being given to Captain Lauth, whose work it was to review them. These bags, however, never brought anything of importance to light, except that the leakage of secret information had not ceased since the condemnation of Dreyfus.

== The "petit bleu" ==
The chief of the staff, Raoul Le Mouton de Boisdeffre, told Picquart that in his opinion the Dreyfus affair was not definitively settled. They believed that they must be on the lookout for a counter-attack from the Jews. In 1894, they had not been able to discover a motive for the treason; there was therefore every reason for continuing the search to "strengthen the dossier."

In March 1896, Commandant Henry made only short and infrequent visits to Paris. One day he sent Madame Bastian's paper bag, particularly bulky on this occasion, to Picquart without looking at the contents. Picquart, also without inspecting it, passed it on to Lauth. Lauth later brought his chief a pneumatic tube telegram (commonly known as a "petit bleu"), the fragments of which he had found in the bag; pasted together, they contained the following words:

To Major Esterhazy, 27 Rue de la Bienfaisance, Paris.

Sir: I am awaiting first of all a more detailed explanation [than] that which you gave me the other day on the subject in question. Consequently I beg you to send it to me in writing that I may judge whether I can continue my relations with the firm R. or not. C.

The writing of this note was disguised, but the place it came from left no room for doubt that it came from Colonel Max von Schwartzkoppen; the office possessed another document, known to have been written by him, and signed with the same initial "C." The "petit bleu" had not been sent by mail; apparently, after having written or dictated it, Schwartzkoppen decided not to send it and threw it away, taking care to tear it up into more than fifty very small pieces. He had not foreseen the patient industry of the Intelligence Department.

Captain Lauth felt the note might mean that there was another traitor among the officers. Picquart shared his impression; but determined to avoid the indiscretions and blunders which had been committed in 1894, he decided to secretly investigate himself before spreading the news of the discovery. He put the "petit bleu" away in his strong-box, and shortly afterward had photographs of it taken by Lauth.

== Major Esterhazy ==
Picquart began by getting information about the personality of Major Esterhazy, to whom the "petit bleu" was addressed. He spoke to his friend Major Curé, one of Esterhazy's fellow soldiers.

He discovered that Esterhazy had been under suspicion of malversation in Tunis and of espionage; he learned that Major Esterhazy was constantly absent from his garrison. He learned that Esterhazy collected information on confidential military questions, particularly those concerning mobilization and artillery. Esterhazy attended artillery tests, and when he could not succeed in being ordered to attend he went there at his own expense. This is what he had done notably in 1894, the year of the discovery of the bordereau, whose alleged writing cost Dreyfus the condemnation. He also borrowed books and documents, and had them copied by his secretaries.

== Picquart's investigations ==
At first Picquart did not establish any connection in his own mind between the "petit bleu" and the bordereau; he simply thought he was on the track of a fresh traitor, and hoped to catch him in the act. However, Esterhazy had been warned, and not only was it impossible to surprise him in any compromising visit, but he showed himself openly at the German embassy, to which he went to ask for a passport for his colonel. He insisted that he be allowed to return to the War Office, in preference to the Intelligence Department, and was able to attain the post through the highest parliamentary and military influence.

However, a fresh incident occurred to strengthen Picquart's suspicions. The French military attaché at Berlin, Foucault, informed him of a curious conversation he had had with Richard Cuers, a spy who wavered between France and Germany. Cuers told Foucault that Germany had never employed Dreyfus, that the only French officer who was in Germany's pay was a major of infantry who had furnished some sheets from lectures held at the shooting school at Châlons.

== The secret dossier ==
Picquart told General de Boisdeffre about his discovery, and upon the order of the general and of the minister of war, Jean-Baptiste Billot, he was directed to continue his inquiry as quietly as possible. Boisdeffre did not seem to be interested in pursuing the case. If Esterhazy were really a traitor, he would be dismissed from the army quietly; another Dreyfus affair was to be avoided. Picquart now set to work in earnest to get samples of Esterhazy's handwriting, and he succeeded in obtaining two letters which the major had written. On looking at them Picquart discovered that the writing was identical with that of the bordereau attributed to Dreyfus. He wished to make sure of his impression, so he showed some photographs of these letters to Armand du Paty de Clam and Alphonse Bertillon.

Du Paty declared: "They are from Matthew Dreyfus"; Bertillon said: "It is the writing of the bordereau." And when Picquart told him the letters were of recent date, he declared: "The Jews have, for the past year, been training some one to imitate the writing; he has succeeded in making a perfect reproduction."

Picquart realised that if Esterhazy, as the handwriting seemed to indicate, were the author of the bordereau, Dreyfus must be the victim of a judicial error. He obtained the secret dossier communicated to the judges in 1894, and which had been stored since then in Henry's safe. He discovered that the documents in the dossier contained absolutely nothing that applied, or could be made to apply, to Dreyfus. Of the only two papers that were of any importance, one, the document "canaille de D ...," did not in any way concern any officer, but only someone who had assumed the name of Dubois, while the other, the memorandum of Schwartzkoppen, almost certainly pointed to Esterhazy. Du Paty's commentary was a mass of wild suppositions. Later this commentary was claimed by General Mercier as his private property and quietly destroyed by him.

Picquart immediately drew up a report and brought it to Boisdeffre, who ordered Picquart to relate his story to the deputy-chief of the staff, Charles Arthur Gonse. The general received Picquart, listened to his revelations, and concluded that they must "separate the two affairs", that of Dreyfus and that of Esterhazy. These instructions, confirmed by Boisdeffre, seemed absurd to Picquart, since the bordereau established an indissoluble bond between the two cases; he should have understood from that moment that his superiors had determined not to permit the reopening of the Dreyfus affair.

== General Billot ==
Most of the officers involved in the case were afraid that they would lose their positions in the military if they publicly confessed the part they had taken in the mistaken conviction of Dreyfus in 1894 and the subsequent cover-up. General Billot, to whom Picquart, following Boisdeffre's orders, made a complete report of the case, appeared deeply moved. He did not have any reason to defend the judgment of 1894, for he had had nothing to do with it, and learned for the first time the contents of the secret dossier. But he did not act.

Picquart meanwhile was unaware that in his own office he was spied upon, opposed, and deceived by his fellow workers, Henry, Lauth, and the archivist Félix Gribelin. One of them, Henry, had served with Esterhazy at the Intelligence Office, and had been his friend and debtor since 1876, although he pretended to know very little about him. If it is not certain that Henry was Esterhazy's accomplice, it seems very probable that from the end of 1894 he knew him to be the author of the bordereau.

== The Castelin interpellation ==
In September 1896, the false rumor of Dreyfus's escape brought the case abruptly back to public notice. The anti-Jewish press inveighed against the accomplices, the protectors of the traitor; a member of the Chamber, André Castelin, announced that at the opening of the next session he would formally question the ministry on the subject. The Dreyfus family was pursuing an inquiry and was getting ready to publish a pamphlet demanding the revision of the case. Picquart believed Castelin was working for the Dreyfus family.

In early September Picquart came into possession of a strange forgery. It was a letter in a feigned handwriting written in the German style, pretending to be addressed to Dreyfus by a friend named Weiss or Weill, and referring to "interesting documents" written in invisible ink. This was probably the beginning of the plot to discredit Picquart. He insisted to General Gonse that the initiative should come from the Staff Office to investigate. Gonse answered by vaguely advising him to act with prudence, and was opposed to the "expertises" in handwriting that Picquart requested. On 14 September L'Eclair published a retrospective article under the title "The Traitor" which pretended to bring to light the real motives for the judgment of 1894. The article revealed for the first time the fact of the communication to the judges of a secret document, but this document – the letter "canaille de D ..." – now became a "letter in cipher" in which the following phrase was found: "This creature Dreyfus is becoming decidedly too exacting." This article had been brought to "L'Eclair" by a contributor to the Petit Journal. Picquart attributed it to the Dreyfus family, and wanted to investigate, but his superiors would not allow it. This only caused him to insist more firmly that immediate steps should be taken. Then took place between General Gonse and Picquart this dialogue:

"What can it matter to you," said the general, "whether this Jew remains at Devil's Island or not?"
"But he is innocent."
"That is an affair that can not be reopened; General Mercier and General Félix Gustave Saussier are involved in it."
"Still, what would be our position if the family ever found out the real culprit?"
"If you say nothing, nobody will ever know it."
"What you have just said is abominable, General. I do not know yet what course I shall take, but in any case I will not carry this secret with me to the grave."

From that day Picquart's removal was decided. He was authorized for the sake of appearances to continue his investigations concerning Esterhazy, but he was forbidden to take any decisive steps or to have Esterhazy arrested. Picquart found that ordinary measures – secret searches in his rooms, opening of his correspondence, examination of his desks – were of no avail, because Esterhazy had been warned.

== Henry's confirmatory letter ==
Meanwhile, Henry told General Gonse that it would be advisable to put the secret dossier of the Dreyfus case out of the way. Gonse removed the dossier on 30 October. A few days later Henry brought him a letter written in blue pencil from the Italian military attaché Alessandro Panizzardi which, he said, he had just found among some scraps in Madame Bastian's paper bag on 31 October. The letter said:

My dear friend: I have read that a deputy is going to ask several questions on the Dreyfus affair. If they request any new explanations at Rome, I shall say that I never had any dealings with this Jew. That is understood. If they question you make the same reply, for nobody must ever know what has happened to him. Alexandrine.

The writing was apparently Panizzardi's, and in order to compare it Henry produced an earlier letter, supposed to have been taken from the waste of the secret dossier, written with the same pencil, on the same sort of paper ruled in squares, and containing the same signature. In reality, the letter brought for comparison contained fraudulent additions hinting at a Jewish traitor, while the new document was a complete forgery executed by one of Henry's customary forgers named Lemercier-Picard, who later admitted to Count Tornielli that he had written it. Gonse and Boisdeffre believed or pretended to believe in its authenticity, and convinced General Billot. When Colonel Picquart expressed his doubts to Gonse, the latter answered: "When a minister tells me anything I always believe it."

On 6 November, the memoir written by Bernard Lazare on behalf of the Dreyfus family appeared in Brussels. The memoir laid bare the inconclusive character of the incriminating document (without, however, publishing it), and affirmed, in opposition to "L'Eclair," that it bore only the initial "D" and not the name "Dreyfus". The pamphlet, distributed to the members of the Chamber, received a cold welcome from the press.

On 10 November, Le Matin published a facsimile of the bordereau attributed to Dreyfus. It had been obtained from the handwriting expert Teyssonnières, who had kept a photograph of the document. The publication of the facsimile allowed handwriting experts all over the world to prove the differences that existed between the writing of the bordereau and that of Dreyfus. Moreover, Esterhazy's handwriting was recognized, particularly by Schwartzkoppen, by Maurice Weil, and by a solicitor's clerk, the son of the chief rabbi Zadoc Kahn. Maurice Weil, one of Esterhazy's intimate friends, sent to the minister of war an anonymous letter which he had just received and which warned him that Castelin intended to denounce Esterhazy and Weil as accomplices of Dreyfus.

The Staff Office blamed Picquart for these embarrassing facts coming into the open, and decided that his departure from the service should be arranged. Boisdeffre went with him to the minister, who rebuked Picquart soundly for having let information leak out and for having seized Esterhazy's correspondence without authorization. In recognition of his past services he was not disgraced, but was ordered to set out immediately to inspect the intelligence service in the east of France, and to resign his position to General Gonse. He left on 16 November without protesting. Two days later Castelin's interpellation was made, but it failed in its purpose. Castelin demanded that proceedings should be instituted against the accomplices of the traitor, among whom he named Dreyfus' father-in-law Hadamard, the naval officer Emile Weyl, and Bernard Lazare. General Billot, who had addressed the Chamber before Castelin, claimed the actions of 1894 had been perfectly legitimate, and made an appeal to the patriotism of the assembly to terminate a "dangerous debate." After a short and confused argument the Chamber voted an "ordre du jour" of confidence, inviting the government to inquire into the matter and to take proceedings if there were cause. A petition from Madame Dreyfus was put aside by the judicial committee for want of sufficient proof.

== Machinations against Picquart ==
Meanwhile, Picquart was sent from Nancy to Marseille, and later on to Tunis, where he was attached to the Fourth Regiment of sharpshooters in garrison at Sousse. General Gonse wrote to him upon the question of money, as if to suggest purchasing his silence. Picquart recorded the history of his discovery in a codicil to his will, which he intended for the president of the republic; in this way he was sure "not to take his secret with him to the grave".
