= Other investigations of the Dreyfus affair =

After Major Georges Picquart's exile to Tunisia others took up the cause of the Alfred Dreyfus.

== Henry's forgeries ==
Major Henry, though under the nominal direction of Gonse, had become the real head of the Intelligence Office, where he quietly prepared a whole series of forgeries, designed, when the opportunity presented itself, to crush Picquart if he ever attempted to cause trouble. After having put at rest the mistrust of his former chief by pretended protestations of devotion, in June, 1897, he suddenly flung off his mask. Picquart, irritated at continually receiving missives from the agents of his former service, wrote a rather hasty note to Henry, in which he denounced "the lies and the mysteries" with which his pretended mission had been surrounded during the past six months. Henry, after having consulted his superiors, answered, declaring that as far as "mysteries" were concerned he knew only that the following facts had been established against Picquart by an "inquiry":

1. The opening of correspondence unconnected with the service.
2. A proposal to two officers to testify, should such action be necessary, that a paper, registered as belonging to the service, and emanating from a well-known person, had been seized in the mails – a reference to a remark made by Lauth to Picquart, that the "petit bleu" addressed to Esterhazy was lacking the regular stamp of the post-office.
3. The opening of a secret dossier, followed by disclosures.

This letter, to which Picquart replied by a brief protest, opened his eyes; he understood the plot that was being hatched against him, the dangers which threatened him for having been too discerning. He asked for leave, went to Paris, and disclosed his affair to his old friend and comrade Leblois, a lawyer. Without revealing to Leblois any secret document, even the "petit bleu," he told him that he had discovered Esterhazy's crime and the innocence of Dreyfus; he authorized him, in case of necessity, to inform the government, but absolutely forbade him to apprise either the brother or the lawyer of Dreyfus. Leblois did not long remain the only recipient of the secret. A few days later chance brought him in contact with one of the few statesmen who had shown any sympathy with the researches of Matthew Dreyfus – the Alsatian Scheurer-Kestner, former member of the Chamber of Deputies for Alsace and coworker with Gambetta, and now vice-president of the Senate and one of the most justly esteemed men of the Republican party. Since 1895 Scheurer-Kestner, induced by the deputy Ranc and by Matthew Dreyfus, had made some inquiries. In 1897 the friends of Dreyfus returned to the charge. Scheurer-Kestner was surprised to find that all the so-called moral proofs, the tales that were brought forward to explain the crime of Dreyfus, did not bear investigation. The expert Teyssonnières, sent to him by his friend and colleague Trarieux, former minister of justice, did not succeed in convincing him that the bordereau was in the writing of Dreyfus. In great distress, he went to tell his old comrade Billot of his suspicions; the general reassured him: a secret document discovered since the condemnation, at the moment of Castelin's interpellation, had removed all doubts; Billot related the substance of it to him without letting him see it. This "crushing blow," which he kept in reserve for the partisans of Dreyfus, was Major Henry's forgery.

== Scheurer-Kestner's inquiries ==
Scheurer-Kestner was at this point of his inquiry when Leblois, who had met him at dinner one evening, conceived the idea of having recourse to him as the medium by which to save Dreyfus and, through Dreyfus, Picquart. Going to Scheurer-Kestner's house, Leblois told all he knew, and showed him Gonse's letters. Scheurer-Kestner was finally convinced, and swore to devote himself to the defense of the innocent (July 13, 1897). But he was much puzzled as to what course to pursue. Leblois had forbidden him to mention Picquart's name, and Picquart had forbidden that the Dreyfus family should be told. In this perplexity, born of the initial mistake of Picquart, Scheurer-Kestner pursued the most unlucky tactics imaginable; instead of quietly gathering together all his documents and uniting his forces with those of Matthew Dreyfus, he allowed the rumor of his convictions to be spread abroad, and thus put the Staff Office on the alert, gave them time to prepare themselves, and allowed the hostile press to bring discredit upon him and to weaken beforehand by premature and mutilated revelations the force of his arguments.

== Tactics of the Staff Office ==
Billot soon began to feel uneasy; he conjured his "old friend" to do nothing without having seen him; that is to say, until the end of the parliamentary recess. Scheurer-Kestner, without suspecting anything, gave him his word, leaving a clear field to Esterhazy's protectors. In the meantime this personage had been quietly dismissed from active service. Billot, who it is claimed looked upon him as "a scoundrel, a vagabond," perhaps even as the accomplice of Dreyfus, had indignantly opposed his readmission into the War Office. On 17 August Esterhazy was put on the retired list "for temporary infirmities"; but, that done, there remained the prevention of his being "substituted" for Dreyfus. That it was Scheurer-Kestner's plan to demand this substitution, the Staff Office did not doubt for a moment, for Henry's secret police had followed Picquart to Leblois' house, and then Leblois to Scheurer-Kestner's. It was even fancied that Scheurer-Kestner was much more fully informed than was really the case.

Toward the middle of October a meeting was held at the War Office, in anticipation of Scheurer-Kestner's impending campaign. Gonse, Henry, Lauth, Du Paty de Clam, were all present; the last, although having nothing to do with the Intelligence Office, had been summoned to it as the principal worker in the condemnation of Dreyfus, and as interested therefore more than any one in maintaining it. Gonse set forth the plot "of the Jews" to substitute for Dreyfus Esterhazy, an officer of doubtful character, but whom a minute inquiry had cleared of all suspicion of treachery: who was, however, a nervous man, and who, under the blow of a sudden denunciation, might lose his head and take flight or even kill himself; and that would mean catastrophe, war, and disaster. Esterhazy must then be warned, to prevent him from going quite mad. But how was it to be done? It was decided to send him an anonymous letter in order that he might take courage. Billot objected to this proceeding; it seems, however, that somebody disregarded the objection, for Esterhazy received (or pretended to have received) a letter signed Espérance, warning him that the Dreyfus family, informed by a certain Colonel Picquart, intended to accuse him of treason. One fact is certain – that he settled in Paris, went to see Schwartzkoppen, and told him that all was lost if he (Schwartzkoppen) did not go and declare to Madame Dreyfus that her husband was guilty; on the indignant refusal of Schwartzkoppen he threatened to blow his brains out.

At the Staff Office Henry and Du Paty, understanding at once the wishes of Boisdeffre and of Gonse, resolved to join forces with Esterhazy. The keeper of the records, Gribelin, went in disguise to take a letter to Esterhazy fixing a rendezvous in the park of Montsouris. There, while Henry (fearing, as he said, recognition by his former comrade) kept watch, Du Paty, who was also disguised, told Esterhazy that he was known to be innocent, and that he would be defended on condition that he conformed rigorously to the instructions that would be given to him. After this interview, Esterhazy went to Schwartzkoppen quite cheered up, and told him that the staff was entering into a campaign for his defense. A week later Schwartzkoppen had himself recalled to Berlin; it was the discreet but significant avowal that "his man was taken." Meanwhile, Esterhazy, as agreed upon, was receiving his daily instructions from the Staff Office. Every evening from this time on Gribelin brought to him at the Military Club the program for the next day; Du Paty and Henry, whose connection with the affair Esterhazy soon knew, saw him several times, sometimes at the Montmartre cemetery, sometimes on the Pont d'Alexandre III. Later on, when these meetings were considered too dangerous, they corresponded with him through the medium of his mistress, of his lawyer, or of his cousin Christian.

Following instructions, Esterhazy wrote to Billot, ending his letter with the threat that if he were not defended he would apply to the German emperor. He wrote in the same strain to the president of the republic, claiming that a lady, afterward mysteriously referred to as the "veiled lady", had given him a photograph of a very important document which Picquart had acquired from an embassy and which seriously compromised persons of high diplomatic rank. This braggadocio was taken so seriously that General Leclerc received an order at Tunis to question Picquart on having given to an outsider – the "veiled lady" – the "document of deliverance." Receiving no answer, Esterhazy, in his third letter (5 November), virtually held the knife at the president's throat: the stolen document proved the rascality of Dreyfus; if he should publish it, it would be war or humiliation for France. This time they made up their minds to listen to him. General Saussier was charged with interrogating Esterhazy in regard to the "document of deliverance"; he obtained no details from him, but made him promise to send back the document to the minister. On 15 November (the day when Matthew Dreyfus wrote his denunciation) it was "restored" to Saussier in a triple envelope, sealed with Esterhazy's arms: the "document of deliverance," as Esterhazy called it, was a photograph of the document "canaille de D . . ." There is nothing to prove that Esterhazy had ever had it in his hands. Billot acknowledged the receipt by the hand of his "chef de cabinet," General Torcy. By these barefaced stratagems Esterhazy and his defenders on the staff made certain of the complicity of the minister and of the president of the republic, while they compromised Picquart more deeply.

== The "Speranza" and "Blanche" telegrams ==
With the latter they proceeded to further measures. At the end of October Boisdeffre had ordered General Leclerc, commanding the corps of occupation in Tunis, to send Picquart to reconnoitre on the frontier of Tripoli, from which quarter pretended gatherings of the local tribes were reported. It was a dangerous region, where Morès had met his death; General Leclerc was astonished at the order, and, having heard from Picquart the cause of his disgrace, forbade him to go farther than Gabes. Some days later Picquart had to clear himself of the accusation of allowing a woman to purloin the "document of deliverance" of Esterhazy. Then, on 11 November and 12 November, he received one after the other two telegrams worded: (1) "Arrest the demigod; all is discovered; very serious affair. Speranza." (2) "It has been proved that the 'bleu' was forged by Georges. Blanche." The obscure allusions and the names in these forgeries were derived from Picquart's private correspondence, which had been looked through, and were intended to produce the impression that Picquart was in some plot to release Dreyfus; the "demigod," it was pretended, referred to Scheurer-Kestner. The two telegrams, copied before they left Paris, had convinced the Séreté Générale that Picquart was the moving spirit in the plot. On receiving them, and afterward an anonymous letter in the same style, Picquart sent a complaint to General Billot, and asked that inquiries be made regarding the author of these forgeries.

During this time Scheurer-Kestner was being deceived by his "old friend" Billot. On 30 October he had a long conference with Billot, at which he accused Esterhazy. Billot declared that in spite of persistent investigations nobody had been able to find any proofs against Esterhazy, but that there were positive proofs against Dreyfus. Scheurer-Kestner implored him to distrust suspicious documents, and finally gave him a fortnight in which to make an honest and thorough investigation, promising that he himself would not speak during that time.

== Silence of Scheurer-Kestner ==
He kept his word; Billot did not. During the fortnight not only was the collusion between the staff and the traitor fully organized, but the press, furnished with more or less news by the War Office, spoke openly of Scheurer-Kestner's futile visit to Billot and launched a veritable tempest against the "Jewish syndicate," which had bought a "man of straw" as a substitute for Dreyfus in order to dishonor the army. Scheurer-Kestner, patient but much distressed by the tempest, persisted in his fixed idea of acting only through the government. He saw Méline, the president of the council, several times, but Méline would have nothing to do with his dossier, and advised him to address to the minister of justice a direct petition for revision. This was not bad advice. According to the new law of 1895, a petition for revision founded on a new fact (discovered after the sentence) could only be submitted to the Court of Cassation by the keeper of the seals, after the latter had taken the advice of a special commission. The disposition of the minister (Darlan) was not unfavorable to the adoption of this course; and it is worthy of note that the new facts which were allowed later by the court were at that moment easy to establish; namely, the resemblance between Esterhazy's writing and that of the bordereau and the communication of the secret dossier to the judges.

== Conjunction of Matthew Dreyfus and Scheurer-Kestner ==
The pursuit of such a course would also have had the advantage of taking the matter out of the hands of military justice and of placing it in those of the civil judges, who were less prejudiced. However, Scheurer-Kestner did not dare to pursue this course; he thought his documents not sufficiently complete. Official notes from the ministry (6 November and 9 November) stated the attitude which the government was resolved to take – it determined to respect the "chose jugée" (res judicata, the matter adjudicated). As for the legal proceedings to secure revision, the notice added that Captain Dreyfus had been "regularly and justly" condemned – a formula which soon became the burden of General Billot's song. Matters might still have dragged on had it not been for chance. At the instance of the Dreyfus family, Bernard Lazare had prepared a second and more detailed pamphlet, in which had been gathered the opinions of a large number of French and foreign experts upon the writing of the bordereau as compared with that of Dreyfus. The unanimous conclusion of these experts was that the handwritings were not identical; but while some of them maintained that the writing of the bordereau was natural, others saw in it a forgery. At the same time that this brochure was published, Matthew Dreyfus ordered handbills reproducing in facsimile the bordereau and a letter of his brother's, which were offered for sale. One of these handbills fell into the hands of a stockbroker, Castro, who had had business relations with Esterhazy; he immediately recognized the bordereau as the writing of his former client, and informed Matthew Dreyfus of the fact. The latter hastened to Scheurer-Kestner and asked him: "Is that the same name?" "Yes," the latter replied (11 November).

For four days they hesitated as to the course to pursue, Scheurer-Kestner still persisting in keeping the fortnight's silence promised to Billot on 31 October. In the interim, by means of the press the public mind had been influenced by indications as to the real traitor and by counter-declarations by Esterhazy in "La Libre Parole" concerning the conspiracy of the Jews and of "X. Y." (Picquart).

On the night of 15 November, in a letter to the minister of war which was published at once, Matthew Dreyfus denounced "Count" Walsin Esterhazy as the writer of the bordereau and as the author of the treason for which his brother had been condemned.

== Trial of Esterhazy ==
The hasty denunciation of Esterhazy by Matthew Dreyfus was a tactical though perhaps an unavoidable blunder. To accuse Esterhazy formally of the treason imputed to Dreyfus and not simply of having written the bordereau (perhaps as a hoax or a swindle) was to subject the revision of the case of 1894 to the preliminary condemnation of Esterhazy. With the staff and the War Office fully enlisted against Dreyfus, the court martial which Esterhazy himself at once demanded was of necessity a veritable comedy. Not only was the accused allowed his liberty until the last day but one, not only did his protectors in the Staff Office continue to communicate indirectly with him and to dictate the answers he should make, but the general entrusted with the preliminary as well as with the judicial inquiry, Georges-Gabriel de Pellieux, showed him an unchanging friendliness and accepted without examination all his inventions.

Convinced of the guilt of Dreyfus through the assurances of the staff, and before long by Henry's forged documents, Pellieux refused at the outset to examine the bordereau, on the subject of which there was "chose jugée." Even after the formal order to prosecute, an interpellation of Scheurer-Kestner to the Senate (7 December) was necessary to induce General Billot to promise that all the documents, including the famous bordereau, should be produced for examination. On this occasion also, as he had done some days before in the Chamber of Deputies (4 December), the minister did not fail to proclaim on his soul and conscience the guilt of Dreyfus, thus bringing to bear the whole weight of his high office on the verdict of the future judges of Esterhazy. Premier Méline, on his part, gained applause for declaring "that there was no Dreyfus affair," and the Chamber in its "ordre du jour" stigmatized "the ringleaders of the odious campaign which troubled the public conscience."
