= An Officer and a Spy (film) =

2019 film by Roman Polanski

- Theatrical release poster
- Directed by: Roman Polanski
- Screenplay by: Robert Harris; Roman Polanski
- Based on: An Officer and a Spy by Robert Harris
- Produced by: Alain Goldman; Luca Barbareschi
- Starring: Jean Dujardin; Louis Garrel; Emmanuelle Seigner; Grégory Gadebois
- Cinematography: Paweł Edelman
- Edited by: Hervé de Luze
- Music by: Alexandre Desplat
- Production companies: Légende Films; RP Productions; Gaumont; France 2 Cinéma; France 3 Cinéma; Eliseo Cinema; Rai Cinema; Kinoprime Foundation; Canal+; Ciné+; OCS; CNC
- Distributed by: Gaumont (France); 01 Distribution (Italy)
- Release dates: 30 August 2019 (Venice); 13 November 2019 (France); 21 November 2019 (Italy)
- Running time: 132 minutes
- Countries: France; Italy
- Language: French
- Budget: $24 million
- Box office: $18.9 million

An Officer and a Spy (French: J'accuse) is a 2019 historical drama film directed by Roman Polanski about the Dreyfus affair, with a screenplay by Polanski and Robert Harris based on Harris's 2013 novel of the same name. The French title has its origins in the J'Accuse...! open letter Émile Zola wrote in 1898 in which the author accused many people of France of continuing to support the increasingly blatantly erroneous accusations against Dreyfus.

The film had its premiere at the 76th Venice International Film Festival on 30 August 2019, winning the Grand Jury Prize and the FIPRESCI Prize. It received twelve nominations for the 45th César Awards, the most nominations of any eligible film, and eventually won the awards for Best Adaptation, Best Costume Design, and Best Director. The film was also nominated in four categories at the 32nd European Film Awards, including for Best Film, Best Director, Best Actor, and Best Screenwriter, ultimately winning none. It received David di Donatello and Polish Film Awards nominations as Best Foreign and Best European film respectively. It was a box-office bomb, grossing $18.9 million worldwide against a production budget of $24 million.

== Plot ==
In 1894, Alfred Dreyfus, a captain in the French army, is found guilty of high treason for passing military secrets to the German Empire. He is condemned to exile on Devil's Island; his affair triggers an echo in France since Dreyfus is Jewish. One year later, officer Georges Picquart, Dreyfus' former teacher, is appointed head of the secret service section in the French army (Deuxième Bureau). The man, despite alleged anti-Semitic sentiments, is aware that the trial against Dreyfus was summary and biased by Dreyfus' Jewish origins. Noticing some irregularities in the dossier of the affair, he decides to conduct an investigation to verify Dreyfus' guilt. Picquart discovers that the so-called bordereau, the document that ostensibly proves his guilt, was not written by Dreyfus, as the graphologist Alphonse Bertillon had claimed, but by another soldier: Major Ferdinand Walsin Esterhazy. According to Picquart, he is the real spy, but the evidence has been prejudiced or even falsified to the detriment of Dreyfus.

Picquart is convinced of Dreyfus' innocence and tries to reopen the trial to exonerate him and arrest Esterhazy, but meets the opposition of his superiors: admitting Dreyfus' innocence would result in a great scandal that would lead to the discovery of corruption in the army, while the man, as a Jew, is the perfect scapegoat. Picquart is then removed from office and sent on a mission far from Paris. However, he manages to return and tell everything to his friend, the lawyer Louis Leblois, who begins to organise a committee for the rehabilitation of Dreyfus, involving his colleague Fernand Labori, members of the Parliament and intellectuals, including the famous author Émile Zola.

Picquart's insubordination leads to his arrest, but on the same day Zola publishes in the newspaper L'Aurore the article entitled J'accuse, where he fiercely criticises the irregularities of the trial of Dreyfus and exposes all the people involved in the case. Zola, on a complaint from the government, is tried for defamation and, due to the false declarations made in the courtroom by the soldiers called to witness, the writer is sentenced to one year in prison. While the whole of France is divided between innocent and guilty parties, the intellectuals signing the pro-Dreyfus petition are targeted for popular hatred. Later, after losing a duel against Picquart, Lieutenant Colonel Hubert Joseph Henry, who had testified against Dreyfus, admits he perjured himself, and dies shortly after, apparently by suicide.

Following Henry's depositions, Picquart is acquitted and released, while Dreyfus is repatriated for a second trial which occurs in Rennes in 1899. Shortly before the decisive hearing, the lawyer Labori suffers an assassination attempt and is unable to defend Dreyfus. The man is sentenced again, but the sentence to be served is made lighter by the recognition of the extenuating circumstances. Immediately, the Prime Minister grants Dreyfus a pardon. Picquart would like to continue fighting to prove his innocence, but Dreyfus, exhausted, accepts it. Seven years later there will be full acquittal and reintegration into the army.

In 1907, Picquart is appointed Minister of War, also thanks to the recognition of the judicial error to the detriment of him. Dreyfus asks him for an audience and protests because the years in which he has unfairly served his sentence have not been recognised, preventing him from reaching the rank of lieutenant colonel. Picquart cannot make this concession to him as the political climate has changed again, which causes Dreyfus' outrage. The two men part from each other with respect, never to see each other again.

== Cast ==
- Jean Dujardin as Colonel Georges Picquart
- Louis Garrel as Captain Alfred Dreyfus
- Emmanuelle Seigner as Pauline Monnier
- Grégory Gadebois as Hubert-Joseph Henry
- Hervé Pierre as Charles-Arthur Gonse
- Wladimir Yordanoff as Auguste Mercier
- Didier Sandre as Raoul Le Mouton de Boisdeffre
- Melvil Poupaud as Fernand Labori
- Éric Ruf as Jean Sandherr
- Mathieu Amalric as Alphonse Bertillon
- Laurent Stocker as Georges-Gabriel de Pellieux
- Vincent Perez as Louis Leblois
- Michel Vuillermoz as Armand du Paty de Clam
- Vincent Grass as Jean-Baptiste Billot
- Laurent Natrella as Ferdinand Walsin Esterhazy
- Bruno Raffaelli as Juge Delegorgue
- Pierre Poirot as officier Vallecalle
- Paulo Henrique as officer of état major
- Stefan Godin as General Darr
- Luca Barbareschi as Philippe Monnier
- Mohammed Lakhdar-Hamina as Bachir
- Luce Mouchel as Madame Sandherr
- Fabien Tucci as Sûreté agent
- Franck Mercadal as Capitaine Calmont
- Philippe Magnan as Attorney Brisset
- Pierre Forest as Colonel Maurel
- Jeanne Rosa as Martha Leblois
- Benoît Allemane as Georges Charpentier
- Ludovic Paris as Arthur Ranc
- Gérard Chaillou as Georges Clemenceau
- Nicolas Bridet as Mathieu Dreyfus
- André Marcon as Émile Zola
- Jean-Marie Frin as President of the Jury
- Swan Starosta as Lucie Dreyfus
- Thierry Gimenez as Colonel Jouaust
- Denis Podalydès as Maître Demange
- Jean-Gilles Barbier as Arbitre duel
- Frederic Epaud as Officer
- Brigitte Boucher as Marie Bastian
- Nicolas Wanczycki as Foucault
- Raphael Caraty as The Journalist
- Boris Ventura as The Journalist #2
- Nicolas de Lavergne as Auguste Dutrieux
- Pierre Leon Luneau as Captain Valdant
- Vincent De Bouard as Gribelin
- Edith Le Merdy as Concierge
- Kevin Garnichat as Captain Jules Lauth
- Pierre Aussedat as Colonel Arrestation
- Rafael de Ferran
- Damien Bonnard as Desvernine
- Yannik Landrein as Gast
- Christophe Maratier

== Production ==
Robert Harris was inspired to write the novel by his friend Polanski, who has long had an interest in the Dreyfus affair. Harris followed the novel with a script of the same story, titled D, with Polanski announced as director in 2012.

This film was the third occasion Harris has worked with Polanski. Harris previously co-wrote The Ghost Writer with Polanski, which was also an adaptation of one of Harris's novels, The Ghost. The two first worked together in 2007 on a film adaptation of Harris's novel Pompeii, which was cancelled just before filming due to a looming actors' strike.

Although set in Paris, the film was first scheduled to shoot in Warsaw in 2014, for economic reasons. Production was postponed after Polanski moved to Poland for filming, and the US government filed extradition papers. The Polish government eventually rejected them. By that point, new French film tax credits had been introduced, which allowed the film to shoot on location in Paris.

The film was budgeted at €60m and was next set to start production in July 2016, but its production was postponed again while Polanski waited on the availability of a star, whose name was never announced.

Filming began on 26 November 2018 and was completed on 28 April 2019. The film was produced by Alain Goldman's Légende Films and distributed by Gaumont. The film was shot in the Paris region, such as at the Palais de Justice, the Saint-Germain-l'Auxerrois church and the École militaire de Paris. The scenes in the French Guiana penal colony on Devil's Island were filmed in Plougasnou in Finistère. The team continued filming after this date, notably in Moret-sur-Loing in Seine-et-Marne.

== Release ==
The film had its world premiere at the Venice Film Festival on 30 August 2019. At the Venice Film Festival, the film won the Grand Jury Prize. It was released in France on 13 November 2019, and in Italy on 21 November 2019.

Due to the controversies surrounding the sexual abuse allegations made against Polanski, the film was not released theatrically or on home video in the US, the UK, Australia or New Zealand until 2025, when it played at the Film Forum in New York City.

== Reception ==
=== Box office ===
The film grossed $18.9 million worldwide against a production budget of $24 million, making it a box-office bomb.

=== Critical response ===
On the review aggregator website Rotten Tomatoes, 78% of 46 critics' reviews are positive, with an average rating of 7.4/10. The website's consensus reads: "Depicting the Dreyfus affair with steadfast efficiency and a standout performance by Jean Dujardin, An Officer and a Spy is one of director Roman Polanski's sturdiest efforts in years." Metacritic, which uses a weighted average, assigned the film a score of 56 out of 100, based on 14 critics, indicating "mixed or average" reviews. The film received a standing ovation during its premiere in Venice.

David Sexton, writing for the Evening Standard, gave the film a rating of four out of five, declaring that: "It's an absolute masterclass in how to make a historical film".

The film has received backlash due to parallels Polanski allegedly made between his sexual abuse case and the film's plot.

== Controversy ==
Polanski's attendance at the Venice Film Festival was his first appearance at a major film event since he was expelled from the Academy of Motion Picture Arts and Sciences in May 2018. During the festival, the head of the jury Lucrecia Martel stated: "I don't separate the man from the art. I think that important aspects of the work emerges in the man. [...] A man who commits a crime of this size who is then condemned, and the victim considers herself satisfied with the compensation is difficult for me to judge... It is difficult to define what is the right approach we have to take with people who have committed certain acts and were judged for them. I think these questions are part of the debate in our times." Martel also stated she would not attend a gala dinner in support of the film.

Polanski's producers threatened to pull the film from the festival lineup. Martel later clarified her comments, stating: "According to some reports after today's press conference, I believe my words were deeply misunderstood. Since I don't separate the work from the author and I have recognised a lot of humanity in Polanski's previous films, I am not opposed to the presence of the film in competition. I don't have any prejudice towards it and of course I will watch the film like any other in the competition. If I had any prejudice, I would have resigned my duty as the president of the jury."

Alberto Barbera, the festival director of Venice, had previously defended the film being in the lineup, stating: "We are here to see works of art, not to judge the person behind it. I hope we can just discuss about the quality of the film and not about Polanski and the case with L.A. County."

U.S. distribution companies rejected invitations to a buyers' presentation during the Cannes Film Festival. Howard Cohen of Roadside Attractions stated: "I think we would consider it, though I'm not even sure how I personally feel. People have been releasing his films for years. Now, we are looking at it through a different lens, with good reason. We have to search our souls if it's the right thing to do. What does it mean to release this movie? I don't think that's a settled question even in my mind."

In November 2019, five days before the official release of An Officer and a Spy in France, Polanski faced accusations of rape by a French woman, Valentine Monnier. Upon the release, French feminist groups invaded or blockaded several cinemas, having the film cancelled in some places.

When the film was nominated for 12 César Awards in January 2020, women's groups said that the French film academy was acclaiming "an abuser and rapist on the run". Eventually, Polanski as well as other crew members of An Officer and a Spy did not attend the 45th César Awards ceremony. No one was there to accept the awards on Polanski's behalf. The César Award for Best Director to Polanski was poorly received by the audience. Several people walked out in disgust, including Best Actress nominee Adèle Haenel.

== Accolades ==
Award	Date of Ceremony	Category	Recipient(s)	Result	Ref
César Awards	28 February 2020	Best Film	Roman Polanski	Nominated	
César Awards	28 February 2020	Best Director	Roman Polanski	Won	
César Awards	28 February 2020	Best Actor	Jean Dujardin	Nominated	
César Awards	28 February 2020	Best Supporting Actor	Grégory Gadebois	Nominated	
César Awards	28 February 2020	Best Supporting Actor	Louis Garrel	Nominated	
César Awards	28 February 2020	Best Adaptation	Roman Polanski and Robert Harris based on the novel by Robert Harris	Won	
César Awards	28 February 2020	Best Cinematography	Paweł Edelman	Nominated	
César Awards	28 February 2020	Best Editing	Hervé de Luze	Nominated	
César Awards	28 February 2020	Best Sound	Lucien Balibar, Aymeric Devoldère, Cyril Holtz and Niels Barletta	Nominated	
César Awards	28 February 2020	Best Original Music	Alexandre Desplat	Nominated	
César Awards	28 February 2020	Best Costume Design	Pascaline Chavanne	Won	
César Awards	28 February 2020	Best Production Design	Jean Rabasse	Nominated	
Bodil Awards	8 May 2021	Best Non-American Film	An Officer and a Spy	Nominated	
David di Donatello Awards	3 April 2020	Best Foreign Film	An Officer and a Spy	Nominated	
