= Investigation and arrest of Alfred Dreyfus =

The Dreyfus Affair began in 1894 when a bordereau (detailed memorandum) offering to procure French military secrets was recovered by French agents from the waste paper basket of Maximilian Von Schwartzkoppen, the military attaché at the German Embassy in Paris. Blame was quickly pinned upon Alfred Dreyfus, a young French artillery officer who was in training within the French Army's general staff.

== French espionage ==
Among the military services reorganized after the Franco-Prussian War of 1870 was that of the French Counter Intelligence Department (disguised under the name of "Section de Statistique") led by a Lt Col Jean Conrad Sandherr. It watched the German embassy as one of its principal occupations. The ambassador, Count Münster, had promised on his word of honor that his attachés would abstain from bribing the French officers or officials. However, it was known at the "Section de Statistique" that the new attaché, Maximilian von Schwartzkoppen, probably without the knowledge of the ambassador, continued to pay spies and was in direct correspondence with the War Office in Berlin. According to indications furnished by a former Spanish military attaché, Valcarlos, Schwartzkoppen and the Italian military representative, Colonel Panizzardi, had agreed to exchange the results of whatever discoveries they might make.

To keep an eye on this plotting, the Counter Intelligence Office (the"Section de Statistique") secured the help of a cleaning lady employed at the German Embassy, a certain Marie Bastian. Madame Bastian, wife of a soldier of the Republican Guard, was "a vulgar, stupid, completely illiterate woman about 40 years in age," according to her boss. However she was of Alsatian descent and spoke German fluently. She was hired as a cleaning woman in the office of the German military attaché, Schwartzkoppen. Madame Bastian carefully collected all the scraps of paper, torn up or half-burnt, which she found in the waste-paper baskets or in the fireplace of Schwartzkoppen's office. She put them all in a paper bag, and once or twice a month took them or had them taken to the "Section de Statistique." There the pieces were carefully fitted together and gummed. By this means it was ascertained that, since 1892, certain secret information concerning the national defense had leaked out. Eventually, the conclusion was reached at high levels in the French General Staff that a traitor was passing on confidential military information to the German Embassy in Paris.

== The anonymous letter ==
During the summer of 1894 a document arrived at the French Counter Intelligence Office which was far more alarming than any which had preceded it. It had been retrieved by French spy and cleaning lady Marie Bastian from the waste paper basket of the military attache at the German Embassy, Maximilian von Schwartzkoppen. It was a handwritten list of potentially available and highly sensitive French military documents. It was unsigned and has since become uniquely celebrated under the name of the "bordereau." This list, written on so-called "papier pelure" (thin notepaper), ruled in squares and almost transparent, was torn from top to bottom in two places, but was otherwise intact. The hand written text was present on both sides of the page.

According to the official version, which was long believed to be the true one, the paper had arrived by the usual means, through Madame Bastian; but the appearance of the document, which was hardly torn, makes this story unlikely. It would appear from other disclosures that the letter was taken intact from the letter-box of Colonel Schwartzkoppen in the porter's lodge at the embassy, and brought to the office by an agent named Brucker, who had formerly acted as a go-between of Madame Bastian and French counter intelligence. The detailed documents that this letter announced as having been sent to the German Embassy, along with the original envelope of the initial "bordereau" letter were never found. Here is a translation of this famous document from its French original:

Being without information as to whether you desire to see me, I send you nevertheless, monsieur, some interesting information, viz.:

1. A note concerning the hydraulic brake of the 120, and the way this gun has performed. This phrase is a reference to the hydro-pneumatic recoil mechanism of a field gun called "120mm court Modele 1890 Baquet." It was a heavy field-piece, recently introduced into French artillery service; the mechanism of its hydraulic plus compressed-air short-recoil brake mechanism was quite novel for the time. But according to Touzin and Vauvillier (2006) as quoted from Les materiels de l'Armee Francaise (Les canons de la Victoire 1914–18): "...the 120mm Baquet Mle 1890 was far from being entirely satisfactory". As a matter of published record, only two hundred and ten (210) Mle 1890 120mm Baquet field guns were eventually built. Conversely, and precisely at the same time as the discovery of the "bordereau" in the summer of 1894, the first successful prototype of the highly advanced long-recoil Mle 1897 French 75 field gun had just been tested in great secrecy. Ultimately, over 20,000 French 75's had been built by 1918.]

2. A note upon the 'troupes de couverture' (some modifications will be carried out, according to the new plan). [This referred to troops that would be called to the frontier at the commencement of mobilization. They were destined to "cover" the concentration of the rest of the army; hence their name. The "new plan" is the plan No. XIII. adopted in 1895.]

3. A note concerning a modification in the formations of artillery. [Most likely the "formations de manœuvre," which were just about to be altered by the new regulations.]

4. A note relative to Madagascar. [The War Office was preparing an expedition to conquer that island.]

5. The proposed 'manuel de tir' of field-artillery manual (March 14, 1894). [See below]

This document is exceedingly difficult to get hold of, and I can have it at my disposal for only a very few days. The minister of war has distributed a certain number of copies among the troops, and the corps are held responsible for them.

Each officer holding a copy is required to return it after the maneuvers.

Therefore if you will glean from it whatever interests you, and let me have it again as soon as possible, I will manage to obtain possession of it. Unless you would prefer that I have it copied in extenso, and send you the copy.

I am just starting for the maneuvers.

–D. [The initial was taken to be Dreyfus']

This communication was clearly written in August, 1894, at the latest. The "manuel de tir" for field-artillery is the résumé of the methods used to regulate the actual firing of ordnance on the battle-field; this shooting never takes place during the grand maneuvers in September but only during the "écoles à feu," which begin in May and finish in August. It is these "écoles à feu" that the writer incorrectly translates as "maneuvers," and the word probably has the same meaning in the last sentence.

It seems evident that the bordereau was handed over to Major Henry, who, with Major Cordier, was then assisting Colonel Sandherr, the head of the military counter-intelligence section at the French War Ministry. According to General Auguste Mercier, the letter in question arrived at the office with other documents whose dates ranged from August 21 to September 2. It is probable that Henry kept the "bordereau" in his possession for a considerable time, making it all the more surprising that he did not recognize the undisguised writing of one of his former fellow officers, Major Esterhazy. It was not until September 24 that he spoke about the document to his close associates and to his chief, Colonel Sandherr. Sandherr immediately informed the head of the French general staff, General de Boisdeffre, and the secretary of war, General Auguste Mercier. They concluded that the informant of the German military attaché was a French officer, and furthermore, from the tone and diverse informations in the "bordereau", that he probably was an officer in the General Staff. Nothing justified this last supposition. On the contrary, the technically and grammatically incorrect wording, the difficulty which the author had in procuring the "manuel de tir" (which was distributed freely among artillerymen), and the inflated importance which the informant appeared to attach to his disclosures, all pointed to the suspected informant as not being a staff-officer.

== Investigation ==
Nevertheless, this "first falsehood," suggested perhaps by the previous warnings of Valcarlos, was generally accepted; right from the start, the investigations led down a false path. At first no result was obtained from an examination of handwritings in the bureaus of the department. But on October 6 Lieutenant-Colonel d'Aboville suggested to his chief, Colonel Fabre, the idea that the bordereau, dealing as it did with questions which were under the jurisdiction of different departments, must be the work of one of the officers going through their "stage" (i.e., staff-schooling), they being the only men who passed successively through the various branches to complete their military education; moreover as, out of the five documents mentioned, three had reference to artillery, the officer probably belonged to this branch of the army. It remained only to consult the list of officers in training with the General Staff who had also come from the artillery. While looking through it, the two colonels came to a halt before the name of Captain Alfred Dreyfus, an officer professing the Jewish faith and with family roots in Mulhouse, Alsace a province which had become German in 1871. Captain Dreyfus, who was raised in Paris, was an alumnus of the elite Ecole Polytechnique and a promising young officer. In fact he had been placed in this much coveted temporary assignment on the General Staff as a step up the promotional ladder. However Dreyfus had been in the office of Colonel Fabre during the second quarter of 1893, and Fabre remembered having given him a bad record on the report of Lieutenant-Colonel Roget and Major Bertin-Mourot. Dreyfus had given these gentlemen the impression (upon the most superficial grounds) of presumption and overbearing, and of neglecting the routine of service to go into matters which were kept secret. Fabre and D'Aboville immediately began to search for papers bearing the writing of Dreyfus. By coincidence the writing of Dreyfus showed a likeness to the writing of the bordereau. These officers, inexperienced and prejudiced, mistook a vague resemblance for real identity.

== Arrest ==
From the end of 1892 to September, 1894, Dreyfus went through his "stage" in the Staff Office, receiving excellent reports from all hands, except Colonel Fabre. From 1 October 1894, he went through a placement (stage) in a body of troops, the Thirty-ninth Regiment of the Line, in Paris. His personal characteristics unfitting for command and his slightly foreign accent combined to prejudice people against him; he had also a rather haughty demeanor, associated little with his military companions, and appeared rather too self-confident. But his comrades and superiors, without being much attached to him, recognized his keen intelligence, his retentive memory and his remarkable capacity for work; he was known as a well-informed officer, a daring and vigorous horseman, with decided opinions, which he knew how to set forth skillfully and to uphold in discussion. In short, he was a brilliant and correct soldier, and seemed marked out for a glorious future. Added to all this, he possessed a comfortable private fortune (which brought him an income of $5,000 or $6,000 a year) soundly invested in his brothers' business; he was without any expensive vices, if not without failings, and was leading a settled life. It is difficult to imagine what motive could possibly have incited him to espionage.

His patriotic sentiments were fervent almost to the point of Jingoism. He had also come under the influence of the Boulangist movement, which, for many of his equals, meant revenge on Germany. Antisemitism appears to have been behind the idea that he was a traitor. Even the wording of the listing slip (bordereau) should have shown the absurdity of this supposition: Dreyfus would not have written, "I am just starting for the maneuvers," since that year none of the stage officers went to the maneuvers, having been officially advised by a circular on 17 May not to do so.

Without pausing to consider these objections, Fabre and D'Aboville took their "discovery" to General Gonse, deputy-chief of the staff, and to Colonel Sandherr, an anti-Semite of long standing. General de Boisdeffre, informed in his turn, told the story to the secretary of war. General Auguste Mercier had held this office since December, 1893. Brought face to face with the bordereau, his concern was to act swiftly, because, if the affair came to be known before he had taken any steps, he would be reproached for having shielded a traitor. This fear, and perhaps the hope of being able to pose as the savior of his country, decided him; once started he was forced to pursue the matter. However, he sought the opinion (October 11) of a small council formed of the president of the cabinet (Charles Dupuy), the minister of foreign affairs (Hanotaux), the minister of justice (Guérin), and himself.

The council authorized Mercier to proceed to a careful inquiry; he ordered an examination by an expert in handwriting. The matter was entrusted to Gobert, an expert Forensic document examiner of the Bank of France, who had been recommended to him. With great conscientiousness Gobert pointed out the striking differences between the writing of the bordereau and that of the documents which were given to him for comparison, the "personal folio" of Dreyfus, from which his name had been erased but the dates left, so that it was easy to identify him from the army list. There were some letters which struck the experienced eye at once, such as the open g (made like a y) and the double s made in the form ſs, features which were to be found only in the bordereau.

Gobert concluded (13 October) "that the anonymous letter might be from a person other than the one suspected." This opinion was pronounced "neutral"; a second inquiry was called for, and this time the qualifications of the "expert" for the task were doubtful. Alphonse Bertillon, head of the "service de l'identité judiciaire" at the Prefecture of Police, had already been entrusted with certain photographic enlargements of the bordereau. Bertillon, who already knew the identity of the suspected man, sent in his report the same day. His inference was as follows: "If we set aside the idea of a document forged with the greatest care, it is manifestly evident that the same person has written all the papers given for examination, including the incriminating document." Sheltered by this opinion, Mercier no longer hesitated to order the arrest of Dreyfus. The arrest was conducted in a melodramatic fashion, according to the plans of Major Mercier du Paty de Clam, who, as an amateur graphologist, had been involved from the very beginning in all the details of the affair.

Dreyfus was ordered to appear before the minister of war on the morning of 15 October, dressed in civilian clothes, under pretense of an "inspection of the 'stage' officers." He answered the summons without suspicion. In the office of the head of staff, he found himself in the presence of Du Paty and three others, also in civilian dress, whom he did not know at all; they were Gribelin (the archivist of the Intelligence Office), the "chef de la sûreté," Cochefert, and the latter's secretary. While awaiting the general, Du Paty, pretending that he had hurt his finger, asked Dreyfus to write from his dictation a letter which he wished to present for signature. The wording was most extraordinary; it was addressed to an unknown person, and asked him to send back the documents which had been lent to him by the writer before "starting for the maneuvers"; then followed the enumeration of these documents, taken word for word from the bordereau. Du Paty had flattered himself that the culprit, on recognizing the words, would confess; a loaded revolver lay on a table to allow him to execute justice upon himself.

Things did not turn out as Du Paty had expected. Dreyfus wrote tranquilly on under the major's dictation. There was a moment when Du Paty, who was watching him closely, imagined he saw his hand tremble, and remarked sharply upon it to Dreyfus, who replied, "My fingers are cold." The facsimile of the letter shows no sign of disturbance in the writing, hardly even a slight deviation. After having dictated a few more lines, during which "Dreyfus entirely regained his composure," he ceased the experiment, and placing his hand on the captain's shoulder, he cried: "In the name of the law I arrest you; you are accused of the crime of high treason!" Dreyfus, in his stupefaction, hardly found words to protest his innocence. He pushed away the revolver indignantly, but allowed himself to be searched without resistance, saying: "Take my keys, examine everything in my house; I am innocent." Du Paty and his associates assured him that a "long inquiry" made against him had resulted in "incontestable proofs" which would be communicated to him later on. Then he was placed in the hands of Major Henry, who had been listening from the next room, and whose mission it was to deliver him over to the military prison of Cherche-Midi. In the cab that took them there, Dreyfus renewed his protestations of innocence, and asserted that he had not even been told what the documents in question were, or to whom he was accused of having given them.

At Cherche-Midi Dreyfus was turned over to the governor of the prison, Major Forzinetti, who had received orders to keep his imprisonment secret, even from his chief, General Saussier – an unheard-of measure. Apparently, the minister had some doubts as to the guilt of Dreyfus, and did not wish to publish his arrest until the inquiry furnished decisive proofs.

The conduct of the inquiry was entrusted to Major Du Paty de Clam. Immediately after the arrest he went to see Madame Dreyfus, and ordered her, under the most terrible threats, to keep the matter secret, even from her brothers-in-law. He then made a minute search of the rooms, which furnished no evidence whatever: no suspicious document, no papier pelure (foreign notepaper) was found: nothing but well-kept accounts. A similar search made in the house of M. Hadamard (Dreyfus' father-in-law) ended in the same failure.

Du Paty repeatedly visited Dreyfus in prison. He made him write standing up, seated, lying down, in gloves — all without obtaining any characteristics identical to those of the bordereau. He showed him fragments of a photograph of that document, mixed up with fragments and photographs of Dreyfus' own handwriting. The accused distinguished them with very little trouble. Du Paty questioned him without obtaining any other result than protestations of innocence broken by cries of despair. The suddenness of the catastrophe, and the uncertainty in which he was left as to its cause, reduced the wretched man to such a terrible state of mind that his reason was threatened. For several days he refused to take any food; his nights passed like a frightful nightmare. The governor of the prison, Forzinetti, warned the minister of the alarming state of his prisoner, and declared to General de Boisdeffre that he firmly believed he was innocent.

Not until 29 October did Du Paty show the entire text of the bordereau to Dreyfus, and then he made him copy it. The prisoner protested more forcibly than ever that it was not his writing, and regaining all the clarity of his intellect when faced by a definite accusation, tried to prove to his interlocutor that out of five documents mentioned in the bordereau, three were absolutely unknown to him.

He asked to see the minister: consent was given only on condition that "he start on the road to a confession". In the meantime, writing experts had proceeded with further examinations. Bertillon, to whom the name of the prisoner had now been revealed, set to work again. To explain at the same time the resemblances and the differences between the writing of Dreyfus and that of the bordereau, he said that Dreyfus must have imitated or traced his own handwriting, leaving enough of its natural character for his correspondent to recognize it, but introducing into it, for greater safety, alterations borrowed from the hands of his brother Mathieu Dreyfus and his sister-in-law Alice, in one of whose letters they had discovered the double s made as in the bordereau. This is the hypothesis of "autoforgery", which he complicated later on by a supposed mechanism of "key-words", of "gabarits," of measurements by the "kutsch", of turns and twists. Bertillon's provisional report, submitted on 20 October, inferred that Dreyfus was guilty "without any reservation whatever".

General Auguste Mercier, still not satisfied, had the prefect of police appoint three new experts, Charavay, Pelletier, and Teyssonnières; Bertillon was put at their disposal to furnish them with photographic enlargements. Pelletier simply studied the bordereau and the documents given for comparison, and concluded that the writing of the bordereau was in no way disguised, and that it was not that of the prisoner. The two others, influenced by Bertillon, declared themselves in favor of the theory of identity. Teyssonnières, an expert of no great repute, spoke of feigned writing. Charavay, a distinguished paleographer, judged the prisoner guilty, unless it was a case of "sosie en écritures" – a most extraordinary resemblance of handwriting. He also spoke of simulation to explain away the palpable differences. On 31 October Du Paty finished his inquiry, and handed in his report, which accused Dreyfus but left it to the minister to decide what further steps should be taken. By this time General Mercier was no longer free to decide; the press had interfered. On 28 October Papillaud, a contributor to the Libre Parole, received a note signed "Henry" – under which pseudonym he recognized without hesitation the major of that name; "Henry" revealed to him the name and address of the arrested officer, adding falsely, "All Israel is astir."

The next day the Libre Parole publicized the secret arrest of an individual suspected of espionage. Other newspapers were more precise; days later, on 1 November, the anti-Semitic newspaper founded by Edouard Drumont announced the arrest of "the Jewish officer A. Dreyfus"; there was, it declared, "absolute proof that he had sold our secrets to Germany"; and what was more, he had "made full confession." All this was very awkward for General Mercier. It was too late to drop the case; he would have risked his position as a minister. He summoned a council of ministers, and, without revealing any other charge than that concerning the bordereau, declared that the documents mentioned in the memorandum could have been procured by only Dreyfus. The ministers, most of whom were hearing the story for the first time, unanimously decided to institute proceedings. The papers were made over to the governor of Paris, who gave the order to investigate.

No sooner had the name of Dreyfus been pronounced than the military attachés of Germany and Italy began to wonder if he had been in direct correspondence with the War Office of either country. They made inquiries in Berlin and Rome, and received answers in the negative. In his impatience, Panizzardi had telegraphed in cipher on 2 November: "If Captain Dreyfus has had no intercourse with you, it would be to the purpose to let the ambassador publish an official denial, in order to forestall comments by the press." This telegram, written in cipher, and of course copied at the post office, was sent to the Foreign Office to be deciphered. The first attempt left the last words uncertain; they were thus translated: "our secret agent is warned." This version, communicated to Colonel Sandherr, seemed to him a new proof against Dreyfus. But a few days later the real interpretation was discovered, of which Sandherr himself established the accuracy by a decisive verification. From that time it became morally impossible to bring home to Captain Dreyfus any document which would infer that the traitor was in communication with Panizzardi.

== Judicial inquiry ==
The judicial inquiry had been entrusted to Major Bexon d'Ormescheville, judge-advocate of the first court martial of the Seine département. Comrades of Dreyfus said that they remembered, or thought they remembered, that in his past conduct he had shown signs of excessive curiosity. One officer testified that he had lent him the "manuel de tir" for several days, but that was in July, whereas the bordereau was now believed to have been written in April. An agent named Guénée, charged by Major Henry with the task of inquiring into the question of his morals, picked up a collection of tales which represented Dreyfus as a gambler and a libertine, whose family had been obliged several times to pay his debts. Another inquiry by the Prefecture of Police showed the inanity of these allegations: Dreyfus was unknown in gambling-houses, and Guénée's informants had confused him with one of his numerous namesakes. There was no visible motive; the accusation rested solely on the disputed handwriting.

However, public opinion had already condemned him. The press claimed that Dreyfus had exposed the system of national defense. All the treachery that had remained untraced was blamed on him. People were indignant that the penalty of death for political crimes had been abolished by the constitution of 1848; even death seemed too light a punishment. The only excuse that they found for him was that his race had predisposed him to commit an act of treason, the "fatalité du type."

The yellow press also blamed the minister of war, for keeping the arrest a secret, in the hope of being able to hush up the affair; he was said to be in league with "the Jews". General Mercier now understood that the condemnation of Dreyfus was a question of his own political life or death; convinced or not, he determined to establish the man's guilt. On November 28, he declared in an interview with Le Figaro that Dreyfus' guilt was "absolutely certain." Then, aware of the defects of the evidence, he ordered that a secret dossier should be prepared by collecting from the drawers of the Intelligence Department whatever documents concerning spies could more or less be ascribed to Dreyfus. This dossier, revised and put into a sealed envelope by Mercier himself, with the cooperation of Boisdeffre and of Sandherr, was to be communicated only to the judges in the room where they held their deliberations, without either the accused or his counsel having been able to see it.

As soon as it had become known that General Mercier had decided to pursue the matter, public opinion changed in his favor. "One must be for Mercier or for Dreyfus," proclaimed General Riu. Cassagnac, who, as a personal friend of Dreyfus' lawyer, maintained some doubts as to his guilt, summed up the situation in these words: "If Dreyfus is acquitted, no punishment would be too severe for Mercier!"
