= Mathieu Dreyfus =

Alsatian Jewish industrialist and brother of Alfred Dreyfus (1857-1930)

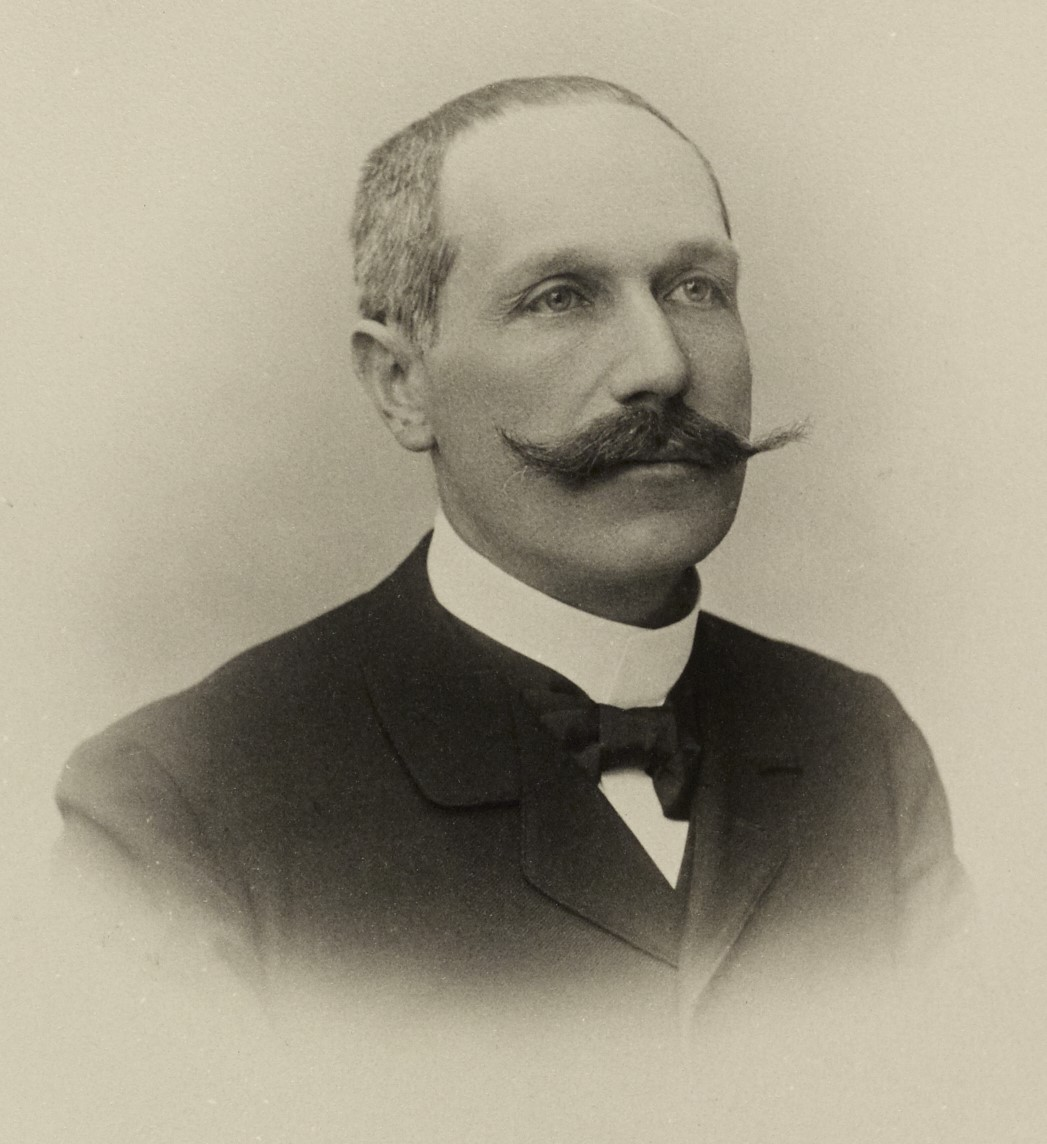
Mathieu Dreyfus, photographed by Nadar.

Mathieu Dreyfus (2 July 1857– 23 October 1930) was an Alsatian Jewish industrialist and the older brother of Alfred Dreyfus, a French military officer falsely convicted of treason in what became known as the Dreyfus affair. Mathieu was one of his brother's most loyal supporters throughout the affair.

== Early life and family ==
Mathieu was born two years before Alfred, in Mulhouse, Alsace, then controlled by France. His schooling was interrupted by the Franco-Prussian War of 1870, a French defeat which led to the loss of Alsace to Germany. His father, the director of a cotton factory, chose to retain French nationality for himself and his young children, and moved the family to Paris.

Mathieu continued his studies in Paris. At 18, he joined the 9th regiment of Hussars at Belfort but, unlike Alfred, he did not pursue a military career. With his other brothers, Jacques and Léon, Mathieu followed the family tradition and worked in the cotton business in Mulhouse. In 1885, he became its director. In May 1889, he married Suzanne Marguerite Schwob, the daughter of a textile manufacturer from Héricourt, not far from Belfort. They had two children. Their daughter, Magui, married Adolphe, the son of Joseph Reinach. Their son Émile served in the French artillery in World War I and was killed on October 22, 1915.

== Start of the Dreyfus affair ==
In October 1894, while he was in Mulhouse, Mathieu received a telegram from Lucie, Alfred's wife, asking him to come to Paris. Arriving on November 1, Mathieu learned that his brother had been arrested for treason. Mathieu had no doubt that the arrest had been a mistake that would quickly be cleared up.

Mathieu arranged a meeting with Armand du Paty de Clam, the commandant who had carried out his brother's arrest. Paty de Clam indicated that the charges against Alfred were overwhelming and he would soon confess. Convinced of his brother's innocence, Mathieu proposed a deal to Paty de Clam: "Let me get close to my brother […] You will listen to our conversation from behind a curtain. If, impossible as it may be, he has done something wrong, he will tell me all and I myself will put the pistol in his hands." Paty de Clam refused.

Mathieu then found a lawyer to represent his brother, Edgar Demange. On December 13, 1894, several days before Alfred's appearance before the Council of War, Mathieu attempted to meet with Colonel Jean Sandherr, the head of the intelligence service and a fellow Mulhousien. Sandherr hid behind military secrecy. Mathieu then contacted the journalist and member of parliament Joseph Reinach, who was also convinced of Dreyfus' innocence. Reinach requested of President Jean Casimir-Perier that the trial not take place in camera, a lost cause.

Mathieu followed all leads to get help. In desperation, he sought out a clairvoyant, who "assured" him of the existence of a secret dossier used illegally against Dreyfus. He became restless, asking all his contacts for their support and seeing himself as threatened with arrest as an accomplice. Paty de Clam briefly suspected him of having written the bordereau, the main piece of evidence used to convict Alfred. For his part, Alphonse Bertillon, called to verify the incriminating evidence, claimed that Captain Dreyfus had imitated the handwriting of his brother Mathieu to hide his own.

By this point, Mathieu understood that he had to lead a real campaign and take daily action to establish the truth of the case. For his efforts, Joseph Reinach described Mathieu as the "admirable brother", Émile Zola as the "heroic brother", and Georges Clemenceau as the "noble Mathieu".

== Struggle for truth ==
In February 1895, just after his brother's deportation, Mathieu met the Jewish anarchist journalist Bernard Lazare, who had just published Antisemitism, its History and Causes. During the summer of 1895, Mathieu gave him all the documents necessary to compose the first exposé dedicated to the affair, which inspired Zola to write his article J'Accuse…!. This exposé was compiled and published as a pamphlet in November 1896, under the title "A Miscarriage of Justice: The Truth about the Dreyfus Affair". In his pamphlet, Lazare dismantled the case against Dreyfus point by point and demanded a review of the case, but the pamphlet failed to stir up those to whom it was addressed.

In 1896, Mathieu tried to reignite public interest in the case by having the English newspaper The Daily Chronicle print a false story claiming that his brother had escaped from his prison on Devil's Island. The story was reprinted without verification in the French press. It was quickly refuted, but still frightened the French authorities into restricting the conditions of Alfred's detention to prevent any escape attempt. After this incident, he was chained up at night and confined to his hut, which was surrounded by an 8-foot-high palisade. Mathieu and Lucie Dreyfus were informed, by accident, of the existence of the secret (illegal) dossier used to convict Alfred. With Lazare's help, they sent a petition to Parliament demanding a review of the case. It was rejected "for lack of evidence." Only the vice-president of the Senate, Auguste Scheurer-Kestner, a fellow Alsatian, spoke up for a new examination of the case.

In 1897, Mathieu Dreyfus hired expert French and foreign graphologists to examine the evidence. They established that the infamous bordereau was not written by Alfred Dreyfus. At the start of November 1897, Mathieu finally received confirmation that commandant Ferdinand Walsin Esterhazy was the true author of the bordereau attributed to his brother. Esterhazy's handwriting was recognized by his banker, Castro, on a poster Mathieu had put up in the streets of Paris. Castro immediately spoke to Scheurer-Kestner, who had already learned this news from other sources. On November 15, Scheurer-Kestner filed a complaint before the Minister of War against Esterhazy. The scandal came out into broad daylight, and the army was forced to open an inquiry. At Esterhazy's appearance on January 10, 1898, the president of the Council of War refused to question Mathieu and Lucie Dreyfus. Esterhazy was acquitted.

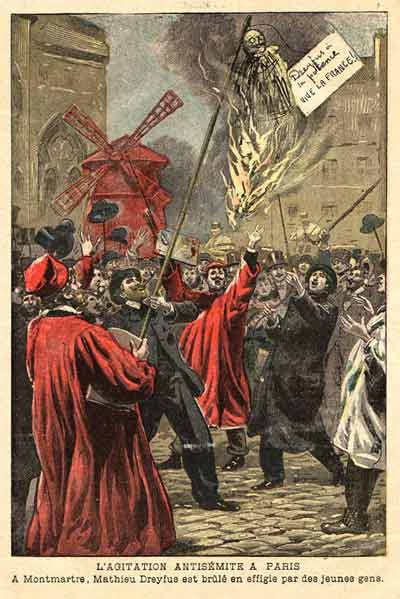
Mathieu Dreyfus burned in effigy at an antisemitic demonstration. Illustration from Le Petit Parisien, 1898.

Supported by Bernard Lazare, Joseph Reinach, and Auguste Scheurer-Kestner, Mathieu persevered in convincing writers, scientists, and politicians that his brother was the victim of a miscarriage of justice. The Dreyfus affair became a government scandal. The "intellectuals" took up the defense of the falsely accused captain. After a retrial at Rennes, on September 9, 1899, Alfred Dreyfus was condemned to 10 years' detention, however the court noted extenuating circumstances. Prime Minister Waldeck-Rouseau offered to arrange a presidential pardon for Alfred. Mathieu persuaded his brother to accept. Seven years later, in 1906, Alfred was finally rehabilitated.

== Later life ==
Mathieu returned to Mulhouse. In 1915, after the outbreak of World War I, the family's cotton business was seized by the German authorities. Mathieu had to content himself with directing the business' branch at Belfort. He did not regain the factory in Mulhouse until 1919, after the end of the war, and then he sold it to Marcel Boussac the next year. Mathieu died in 1930, five years before his brother Alfred.

== See also ==
- Alfred Dreyfus
- Dreyfus Affair
- Antisemitism
