= Maurice Weil =

French army officer (1845–1924)

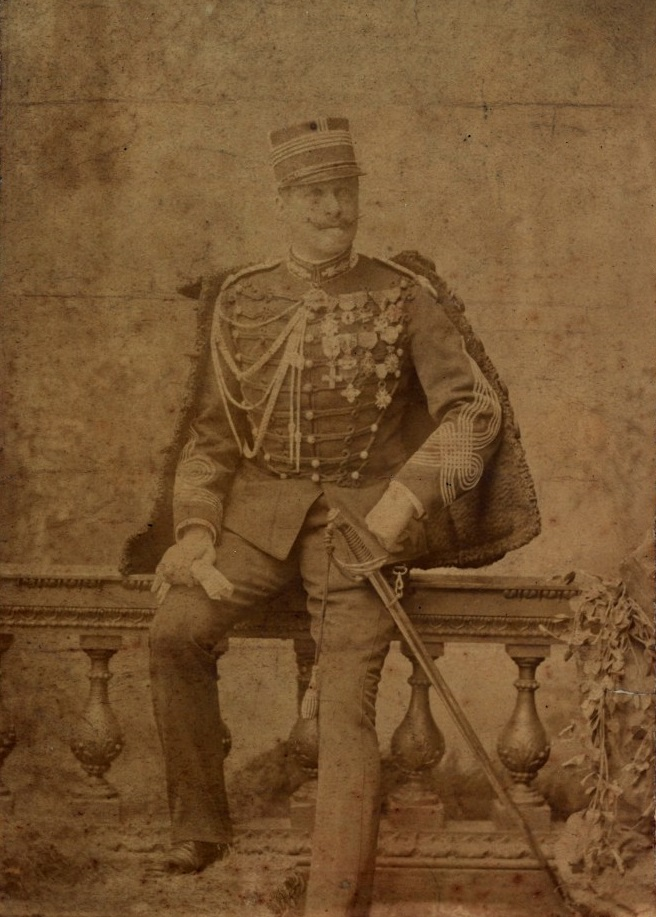
- Presumed photograph of Commondant Weil
- Born: Maurice-Henri Weil; 29 November 1845; Paris, France
- Died: c.13 July 1924 (aged 78); Teplice, Czechoslovakia
- Military career
- Allegiance: (French Third Republic) France
- Branch: French Army
- Service years: 1868–1893
- Rank: Captain
- Units: French Foreign Legion; 3ème Régiment Territorial de Dragons
- Conflicts: Franco-Prussian War
- Other work: Historian

Signature
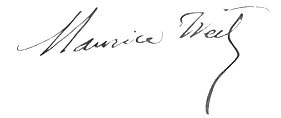

Maurice-Henri Weil (1845–1924) was a French soldier and historian noted for his implication in the Dreyfus Affair.

== Biography ==
Maurice-Henri Weil was born in Paris to Ignace-Léopold Weil, a merchants' commissioner who had been born in Kassel, Hesse in the Holy Roman Empire at the end of the 18th century. Maurice's mother, Pauline Bauer, was a Hungarian Jew who adopted French nationality and converted to Catholicism during the Second Empire. She was the sister of Hermine Bauer (the mother of Armand Rosenthal, a journalist known under the pseudonym Jacques Saint-Cère) and Bernard Bauer.

== Military career ==
Weil joined in the military in the latter years of the Second Empire, and was incorporated into the 8th Battalion of the Garde Nationale Mobile when the corps was established in February 1868, and was promoted to second lieutenant in 1869. Weil participated in the Franco-Prussian War and then in the repression of the Paris Commune. He ended 1871 as an officer under General Jean-Auguste Berthaut, and earned Legion of Honor distinction in 1873.

In 1875, Weil joined the Ministry of War, where his reputation for proficiency in foreign languages, and in particular German, earned him an assignment to the "Statistical Section" (the official name for the intelligence service). During this appointment, Weil became acquainted with Hubert-Joseph Henry and Ferdinand Walsin Esterhazy, who would both later become directly implicated in the Dreyfus Affair conspiracies.

On October 21, 1877, Weil married Henriette Landauer, daughter of Viennese banker Adolphe Landauer and Ellen Henriette Worms, a great-granddaughter of Mayer Amschel Rothschild. In the 1880s, Weil dedicated much of his time to historical research and publication, but also developed a reputation for profligate gambling and loutish habits. He was also known for frequenting Jewish men's clubs and salons, and developing contacts in the Jewish bourgeoisie. In October 1881, Weil was investigated for embezzlement and exiled to Málaga, Spain on the pretext of health-related recuperation for his wife.

After several quiet years, Weil returned to the army in January 1890 under the protection of the Military governor of Paris Félix Gustave Saussier, with whom Weil's wife Henriette would have a protracted extramarital affair. In 1892, following an antisemitic purge of Jewish officers led in-part by the antisemitic newspaper La Libre Parole, Weil was again forced to resign his post in 1893.

== Role in the Dreyfus Affair ==
Despite Weil's resignation in 1893, Weil retained his network and friendships in the Ministry of War. In particular, Weil continued working closely with his friend Commandant Esterhazy, including using his contacts in the Jewish community to help Esterhazy swindle a 2,000-franc charitable donation from Baron Edmond de Rothschild and Grand Rabbi Zadoc Kahn.

Esterhazy would subsequently begin an espionage relationship with the German military attaché Maximilian von Schwartzkoppen. Esterhazy's contacts with Schwartzkoppen would become intercepted in 1894, but misattributed to Alfred Dreyfus, for which Dreyfus was tried and convicted at court-martial of high treason. In 1896, as efforts to revise to Dreyfus verdict were ongoing, Weil was notified that Deputy André Castelin would publicly denounce him as Esterhazy's accomplice in betraying military secrets to Germany. In 1898, Weil testified at Esterhazy's court-martial trial (at which Esterhazy would be acquitted).

Various contemporaries, such as Joseph Reinach and subsequent historians believe Weil was complicit to some degree in Esterhazy's treason, particularly in assisting Esterhazy obtain information and documents to relay to the German military attaché.
