= J'Accuse...! =

1898 open letter by Émile Zola

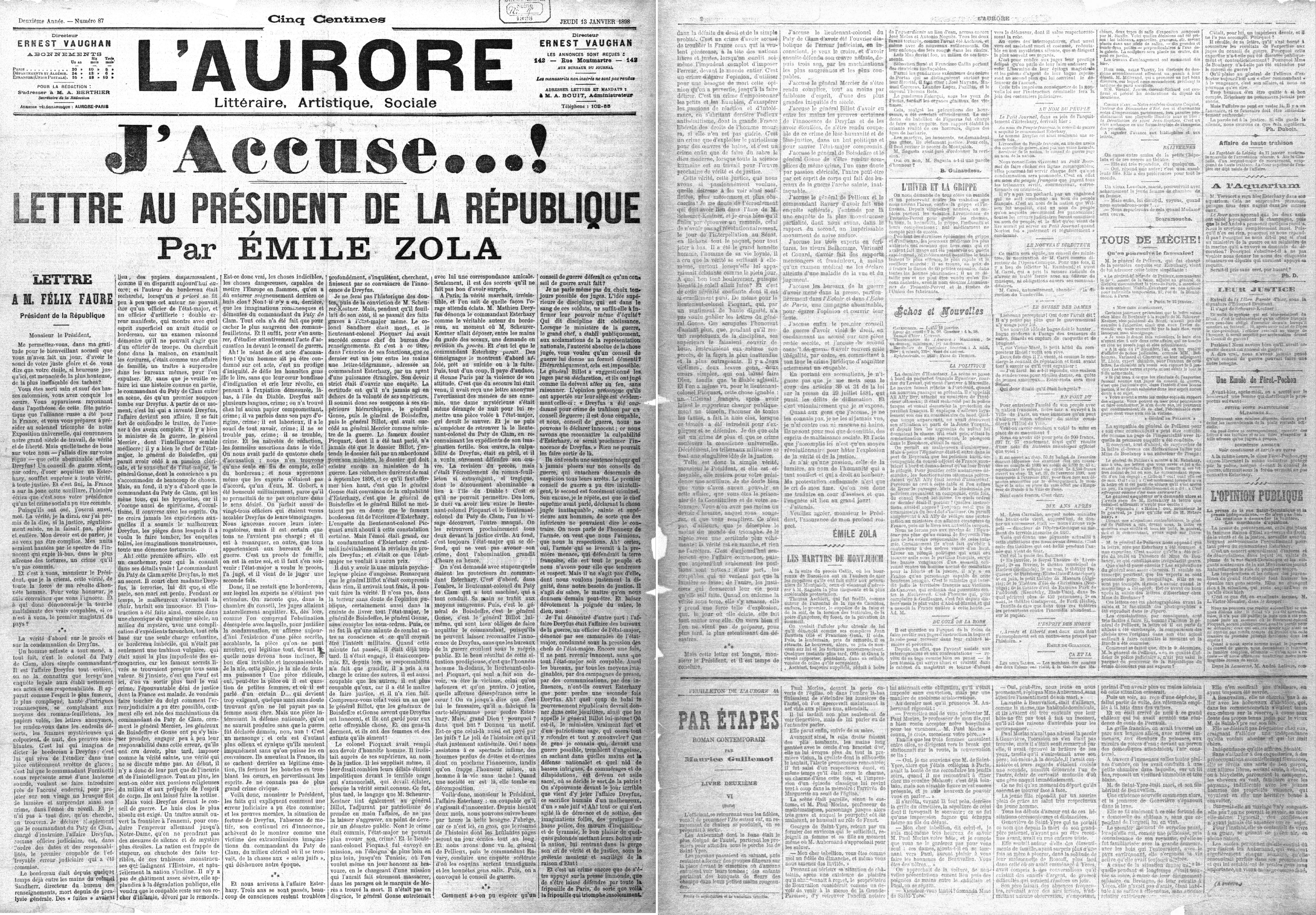
The cover and second page of the newspaper L'Aurore for Thursday 13 January 1898, with the letter J'Accuse...!, written by Émile Zola about the Dreyfus affair. The headline reads I Accuse...! Letter to the President of the Republic.

"J'Accuse...!" (French pronunciation: [ʒakyz]; "I Accuse...!") is an open letter, written by Émile Zola in response to the events of the Dreyfus affair, that was published on 13 January 1898 in the newspaper L'Aurore. Zola addressed the president of France, Félix Faure, and accused his government of antisemitism and the unlawful jailing of Alfred Dreyfus, a French Army General Staff officer who was sentenced to lifelong penal servitude for espionage, and sent to the penal colony on Devil's Island in French Guiana. Zola pointed out judicial errors and a lack of serious evidence during Dreyfus's trial. The letter was printed on the front page of the newspaper, and caused a stir in France and abroad. Zola was prosecuted for libel and found guilty on 23 February 1898. To avoid imprisonment, he fled to England, returning home in June 1899.

Other pamphlets proclaiming Dreyfus's innocence include Bernard Lazare's A Miscarriage of Justice: The Truth about the Dreyfus Affair (November 1896).

J'accuse! is one of the most well-known newspaper articles in the world. As a result of the popularity of the letter, J'accuse! has become a common expression of outrage and accusation against someone powerful in the anglosphere.

== Background ==
=== Dreyfus affair ===
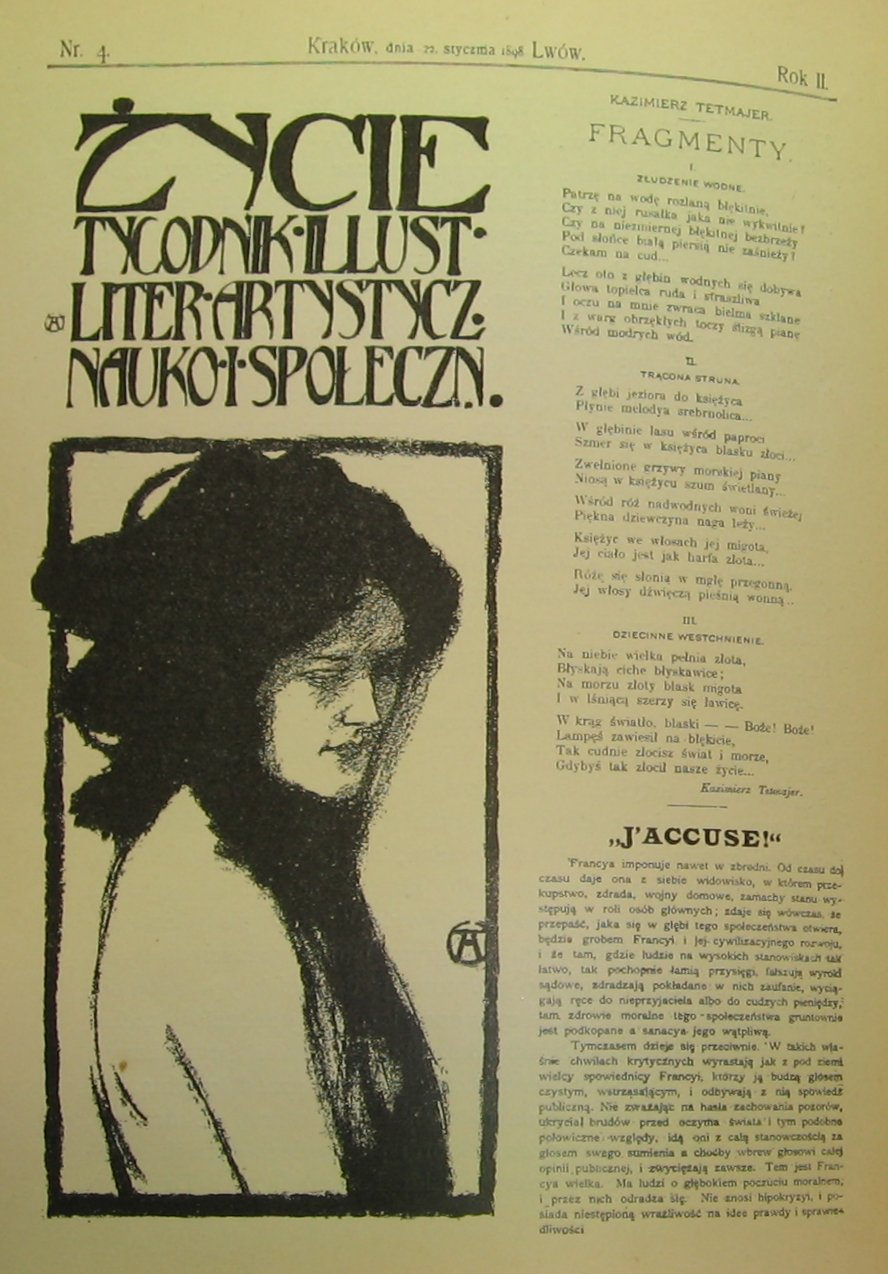
Edition of the Polish Życie reporting on Zola's letter and the Dreyfus affair

Alfred Dreyfus was a French army officer from a prosperous Jewish family. In 1894, while an artillery captain for the General Staff of France, Dreyfus was suspected of providing secret military information to the German government.

A cleaning woman and French spy by the name of Madame Marie Bastian working at the German Embassy was at the source of the investigation. She routinely searched wastebaskets and mailboxes at the German Embassy for suspicious documents. She found a suspicious bordereau (detailed listing of documents) at the German Embassy in 1894, and delivered it to Commandant Hubert-Joseph Henry, who worked for French military counterintelligence in the General Staff.

The bordereau had been torn into six pieces, and had been found by Madame Bastian in the wastepaper basket of Maximilian von Schwartzkoppen, the German military attaché. When the document was investigated, Dreyfus was convicted largely on the basis of testimony by professional handwriting experts: the graphologists asserted that "the lack of resemblance between Dreyfus' writing and that of the bordereau was proof of a 'self-forgery', and prepared a fantastically detailed diagram to demonstrate that this was so." There were also assertions from military officers who provided confidential evidence.

Dreyfus was found guilty of treason in a secret military court-martial, during which he was denied the right to examine the evidence against him. The Army stripped him of his rank in a humiliating ceremony and shipped him off to Devil's Island, a penal colony located off the coast of French Guiana in South America.

France, where antisemitism has always been endemic, was experiencing a particularly intense period at this time; very few outside Dreyfus's family defended him. Nevertheless, the initial conviction was annulled by the Supreme Court after a thorough investigation. In 1899, Dreyfus returned to France for a retrial, but although found guilty again, he was pardoned. In 1906, Dreyfus appealed his case again; he obtained the annulment of his guilty verdict. In 1906, he was also awarded the Cross of the Legion of Honour, which was for "a soldier who has endured an unparalleled martyrdom".

=== Émile Zola ===
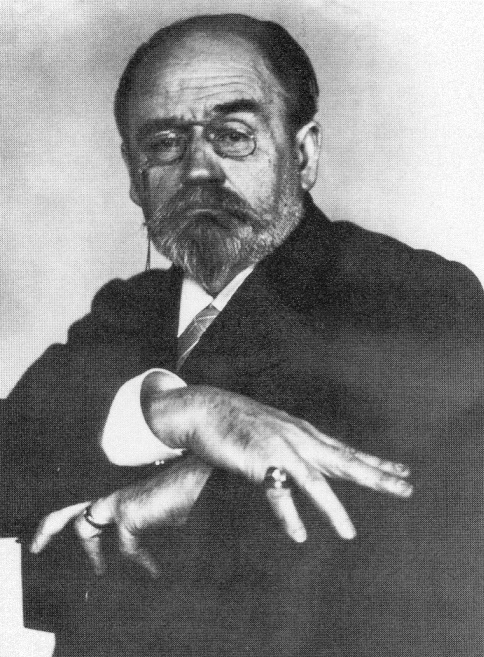
1898 portrait of Zola by Nadar

Émile Zola was born on 2 April 1840 in Paris. His main literary work was Les Rougon-Macquart, a monumental cycle of twenty novels about Parisian society during the French Second Empire under Napoleon III and after the Franco-Prussian War. He was also the founder of the Naturalist movement in 19th-century literature. Zola was among the strongest proponents of the Third Republic. He was made Officer of the Legion of Honour on 13 July 1893, but suspended on 26 July 1898. His rank was reinstated on 10 March 1901.

== Publication ==
Zola risked his career in January 1898 when he decided to stand up for Dreyfus. Zola wrote an open letter to the president of France, Félix Faure, accusing the French government of falsely convicting Dreyfus and of antisemitism. His intention was to draw the accusation so broadly that he would essentially force men in the government to sue him for libel. Once the suit was filed, the Dreyfusards (supporters of Dreyfus) would have the opportunity to acquire and publicize the shaky evidence on which Dreyfus had been convicted. Zola titled his letter J'Accuse...! (French for "I Accuse"), which was published on the front page of Georges Clemenceau's liberal Paris daily L'Aurore.

=== Contents of J'Accuse...! ===
Zola argued that "the conviction of Alfred Dreyfus was based on false accusations of espionage and was a misrepresentation of justice." He first points out that the real man behind all of this is Major du Paty de Clam. Zola states: "He was the one who came up with the scheme of dictating the text of the bordereau to Dreyfus; he was the one who had the idea of observing him in a mirror-lined room. And he was the one whom Major Forzinetti caught carrying a shuttered lantern that he planned to throw open on the accused man while he slept, hoping that, jolted awake by the sudden flash of light, Dreyfus would blurt out his guilt."

Next, Zola points out that if the investigation of the traitor was to be done properly, the evidence would clearly show that the bordereau came from an infantry officer, not an artillery officer such as Dreyfus.

Zola argues Dreyfus's innocence can be readily inferred from the circumstances when he states: "These, Sir, are the facts that explain how this miscarriage of justice came about; The evidence of Dreyfus's character, his affluence, the lack of motive and his continued affirmation of innocence combine to show that he is the victim of the lurid imagination of Major du Paty de Clam, the religious circles surrounding him, and the 'dirty Jew' obsession that is the scourge of our time."

After more investigation, Zola points out that an officer named Major Esterhazy was the man who should have been convicted of this crime, and there was proof provided, but he could not be known as guilty unless the entire General Staff was guilty, so the War Office covered up for Esterhazy.

At the end of his letter, Zola accuses General Billot of having held in his hands absolute proof of Dreyfus's innocence and covering it up. He accuses both General de Boisdeffre and General Gonse of religious prejudice against Alfred Dreyfus. He accuses the three handwriting experts, Belhomme, Varinard and Couard, of submitting false reports that were deceitful, unless a medical examination finds them to be suffering from a condition that impairs their eyesight and judgement.

Zola's final accusations were to the first court martial for violating the law by convicting Dreyfus on the basis of a document that was kept secret, and to the second court martial for committing the judicial crime of knowingly acquitting Major Esterhazy.

== Trial of Zola and aftermath ==
Zola was brought to trial for libel for publishing his letter to the president; he was convicted two weeks later. He was sentenced to jail and was removed from the Legion of Honour. To avoid jail time, Zola fled to England. He stayed there until the cabinet fell; he continued to defend Dreyfus.

Four years after the letter was published, Zola died from carbon monoxide poisoning caused by a blocked chimney. On 4 June 1908, Zola's remains were reinterred in the Panthéon in Paris. In 1953, the newspaper Libération published a death-bed confession by a Parisian roofer that he had murdered Zola by blocking the chimney of his house.

== Subsequent use of the term ==
The most popular Palestinian Arab newspaper, Filastin (La Palestine), published a four-page editorial in March 1925 protesting the Balfour Declaration, beginning with "J'Accuse!"

- In 1913, the Mexican deputy Luis Manuel Rojas gave a discourse (Yo acuso...) in front of the Chamber of Deputies against the American ambassador Henry Lane Wilson due to his participation in the assassination of president and vice-president Francisco I. Madero and José María Pino Suárez.
- In 1915, the German pacifist Richard Grelling wrote a book titled J'Accuse! in which he condemned the actions of the German Empire.
- In 1919, Abel Gance released his film J'accuse as a statement against World War I, shooting Gance to international fame.
- In 1925, the most popular Palestinian Arab newspaper, Filastin (La Palestine), published a four-page editorial protesting the Balfour Declaration with the title "J'Accuse!"
- In 1938, the Belgian fascist politician Léon Degrelle published a polemic booklet titled J'accuse against minister Paul Stengers, of being a "cumulard, a bankster, a plunderer of savings and a coward". It provoked a retaliatory pamphlet titled J'accuse Léon Degrelle.
- J'Accuse was the title of an underground newspaper in occupied France edited by Adam Rayski.
- In 1950, on Easter Sunday, members of the Lettrist movement proclaimed the death of God before the congregation of the Notre-Dame Cathedral in Paris. Michel Mourre used the phrase "J'accuse" to proclaim what he saw as the wickedness of the Roman Catholic Church.
- In 1954, during the controversy surrounding J. Robert Oppenheimer and the allegations that he posed a security risk to the Atomic Energy Commission, journalists Joseph and Stewart Alsop wrote an article for Harper's Magazine titled "We Accuse!", in which they defend Oppenheimer as the victim of a petty grudge held by AEC chairman Lewis Strauss.
- The film I Accuse!, starring José Ferrer as Dreyfus, was released in 1958.
- In 1961, during the trial of Adolf Eichmann, head prosecutor Gideon Hausner used the phrase in his opening statement.
- In 1982, Commentary Magazine editor Norman Podhoretz used the title "J'Accuse" for an article blaming antisemitism for allegedly excessive criticism of Israel during the 1982 Israel-Lebanon war.
- Also in 1982, Graham Greene published J'Accuse: The Dark Side of Nice in which he declared that organised crime flourished in Nice because the city's upper levels of civic government protected judicial and police corruption.
- In 1998, the Australian satirical television program The Games debuted the character Jack Hughes in an episode titled "J'Accuse". The show is a satire critical of, among other things, corruption in the organizing of the Olympic Games in Sydney; the character Jack Hughes is a journalist who often probes into scandals and corruption, much to the annoyance of the show's protagonists.
- In 2003, New Directions published Israeli poet Aharon Shabtai's J'Accuse, a collection of poems drawn from two different collections, Politika and Artzenu, and translated by Peter Cole.
- In 2008, film director Peter Greenaway released a documentary titled Rembrandt's J'Accuse. It is a companion piece to his film Nightwatching. It illustrates Greenaway's theory that Rembrandt's painting The Night Watch leaves clues to a murder by some of those portrayed.
- In 2010, the French rock artist Damien Saez released the album J'accuse whose lead single shares the same title. The album explores themes of social critique, particularly focusing on consumerism and contemporary mass culture.
- In 2012, linguists Noam Chomsky and Hagit Borer, together with seven other colleagues who had recently travelled to Gaza for a linguistics conference, wrote an open letter which began Nous accusons... ('We accuse...') on how the mainstream media fails to report on Israeli atrocities against civilians in Gaza, which was published in Canada, the US and translated, in France.
- In 2012, Wayne Swan, the then deputy prime minister of Australia, told Prime Minister Julia Gillard that she had given the "j'accuse speech" when she delivered her misogyny speech to the Australian Parliament, accusing Opposition Leader Tony Abbott of sexism and misogyny.
- On 13 May 2016, Brazilian columnist and politics professor Vladimir Safatle published an article in the Folha de S.Paulo newspaper titled "Nós acusamos" (we accuse), denouncing the several problems related to the removal from office of Brazil's president Dilma Rousseff.
- On 1 September 2016, Argentinian lawyer and politician Margarita Stolbizer published a book titled Yo acuso ("I accuse") denouncing corruption during the government of Argentina's president Cristina Kirchner.
- On 9 June 2017, The New York Times' White House correspondent Peter Baker wrote, in reference to the testimony of fired US FBI director James Comey before the US Senate's Intelligence Committee, "While delivered in calm, deliberate and unemotional terms, Mr. Comey's testimony on Thursday was almost certainly the most damning j'accuse moment by a senior law enforcement official against a president [referring to Donald Trump] in a generation."
- In 2019, Norman Finkelstein published a book titled I Accuse! in which he attempted to prove that International Criminal Court chief prosecutor Fatou Bensouda failed to properly investigate potential Israeli war crimes in the 2010 Gaza flotilla raid.
- On 19 April 2020, UK cabinet minister Michael Gove used the phrase "a j'accuse narrative" in response to media reporting of the prime minister's absence from COBR meetings during the COVID-19 pandemic.
- On 3 June 2020, The Atlantic, writing about President Trump's former defense secretary and retired marine general James Mattis's comments in an interview in which Mattis strongly criticized Trump on multiple points, characterizing them as Mattis's "j'accuse".
- In the 2021 French television series Lupin, Fabienne Beriot's dog is named J'accuse, because Fabienne is a journalist.
- The French title of Roman Polanski's film about the Dreyfus affair (in which Zola is a character) is J'Accuse, although its English-language title is An Officer and a Spy.
- In 2020, French actor David Serero recorded the entirety of the "J'Accuse" text.
