= Auguste Scheurer-Kestner =

French politician (1833–1899)

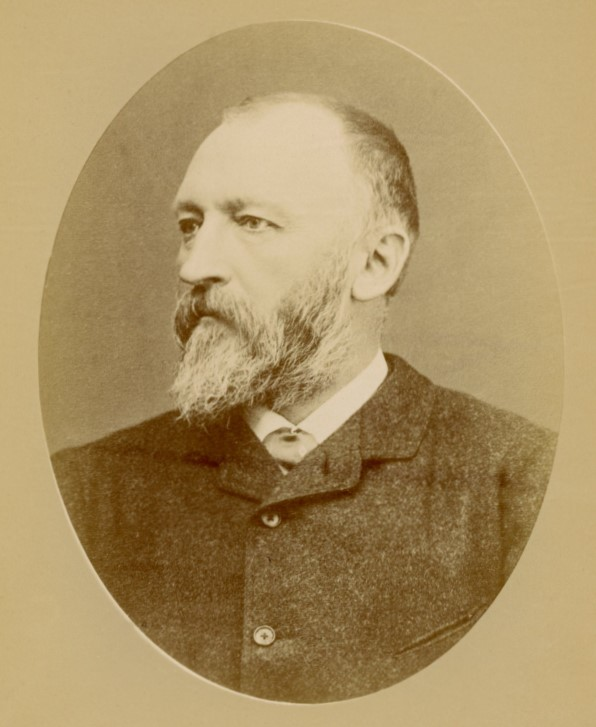
Auguste Scheurer-Kestner

Auguste Scheurer-Kestner (11 February 1833 in Mulhouse (Haut Rhin) – 19 September 1899 in Bagnères-de-Luchon (Haute Garonne)) was a chemist, industrialist, a Protestant and an Alsatian politician. He was the uncle by marriage of the wife of Jules Ferry.

He was a Republican and opposed the French Second Empire of Napoleon III. He was elected member for Haut Rhin on 2 July 1871 and became senator for life on 15 September 1875. Twenty years later, he was the last representative of the Alsace French Parliament. A close friend of Georges Clemenceau and Léon Gambetta, he provided the greater part of the funds for the publication of The French Republic newspaper that ran from 1879 to 1884. In 1894, Auguste Scheurer-Kestner as Senior Vice-President of the Senate was considered a moral authority in politics. He played a major role in opening the Dreyfus case in the summer of 1897.

== Early years ==
Born in Mulhouse on 11 February 1833 as Auguste Scheurer, his father was a Republican industrialist. Auguste attended school at first in Strasbourg then from 1852 in Paris where he was a pupil of Mr Wurtz at the School of Medicine.

In 1856, he married one of the daughters of Mr. Charles Kestner - a manufacturer of chemical products in Thann. He became manager of Mr Kestner's plant at Thann but continued with his scientific research in chemicals.

In 1866, he founded an independent cooperative society where workers could spend their earnings in properly run shops. This institution became very prosperous.

== Political Life ==
Political life was to a certain extent imposed on Mr. Scheurer-Kestner by events and the Republican ideas inspired by his family. His father-in-law Mr Kestner had previously been a representative of the people in 1848 but the "coup d'Etat" forced him to flee to Belgium.

Although he could not have been considered a danger to the Empire despite his Republican views, he was arrested in 1862 and arbitrarily detained for a month in prison before being convicted for three months for internal espionage.

In 1863 and the years following, despite the danger to his family and friends, Mr. Scheurer-Kestner did not hesitate to publish a series of revelations of the manner in which the State safeguarded its secrets under the Empire. He wrote in Le Temps and Le Reveil about the existence of a black cabinet which he called the "Office of Lateness".

After the events of 1870 he offered his services to the government to help to defend France and was appointed Director of the Pyrotechnic Factory in Cette. In 1871 he won the seat of Haut Rhin with a majority of 58,000 votes. At the National Assembly in Bordeaux he sat at the extreme left and did not return to Alsace at the end of the Franco-Prussian War which established him as a patriot of France.

He did not stay out of politics for long and he was elected to represent the Seine by 290,823 votes to 108,038 against and was again a member of the National Assembly. On 16 December 1875 the Assembly nominated him as a permanent Senator and he was one of the Secretaries to the Senate until 1879. Mr Scheurer-Kestner entered the Senate as a member of the Republican Union.

== The Dreyfus Affair ==
On 13 July 1897, Louis Leblois, lawyer for Lieutenant Colonel Georges Picquart, informed Scheurer-Kestner in detail about the Dreyfus Affair. Initially, he did not doubt the guilt of Dreyfus, but he wrote in his diary that he felt "something vague and painful". After the intervention of Bernard Lazare, who tried to overcome his hesitation in 1897, this man "passionately in love with Justice", who saw himself as the protector of all Alsatians in France, redoubled his efforts to try to form a sure opinion.

Scheurer-Kestner went on to defend the innocence of Captain Dreyfus with the war minister, Jean-Baptiste Billot, and with the President, Félix Faure. On 26 November 1897, through her lawyer Mr. Jullemier, Madame de Boulancy, cousin and former mistress of Ferdinand Walsin Esterhazy, took revenge on her lover and debtor: She sent Scheurer-Kestner letters from Major Esterhazy, including the famous "letter of Uhlan." Scheurer-Kestner showed the letter to Pellieux, military commander of Paris who headed the administrative inquiry on Esterházy. A search of Madame Boulancy’s premises took place on 27 November. Le Figaro published the letter on the 28th, exposing Esterhazy's contempt for France and its army.

Scheurer-Kestner was convinced of the guilt of Esterhazy after confiding in the lawyer Louis Leblois, friend of Picquart and also an Alsatian. Scheurer-Kestner communicated his certainties confidentially to President Félix Faure, President of the Council and made a visit in vain to General Billot, Minister of War. Taking up the cause of the review, he contacted Joseph Reinach, and pulled in Clemenceau in November 1897, published in Le Temps an open letter in which he stated the innocence of Dreyfus. Along with Leblois he showed himself at the trial of Émile Zola, who defended him in Le Figaro a few days later. Scheurer-Kestner had indeed received no support from his political friends. The debate had been made public by Mathieu Dreyfus, and Scheurer-Kestner was violently attacked, called "a German industrialist" and "Boche", etc. In December 1897, he shouted at the Senate on the refusal for a retrial, saying: "The truth always wins in the end."

Scheurer-Kestner failed to convince his colleagues in the Senate to lead with him the battle for rehabilitation of captain Dreyfus on 13 January 1898: he received only 80 votes out of 229 voters when he ran for the vice-presidency. Scheurer-Kestner embodied hopes in the law and justice of the Government of the Republic and always recommended patience and prudence, including disapproving of the shaft of light from Émile Zola (J'accuse). Plagued by throat cancer, he followed the retrial from his sickroom. He died on 19 September 1899, the day of the signing of the pardon for Dreyfus by President Émile Loubet.

== Tributes to Scheurer-Kestner ==
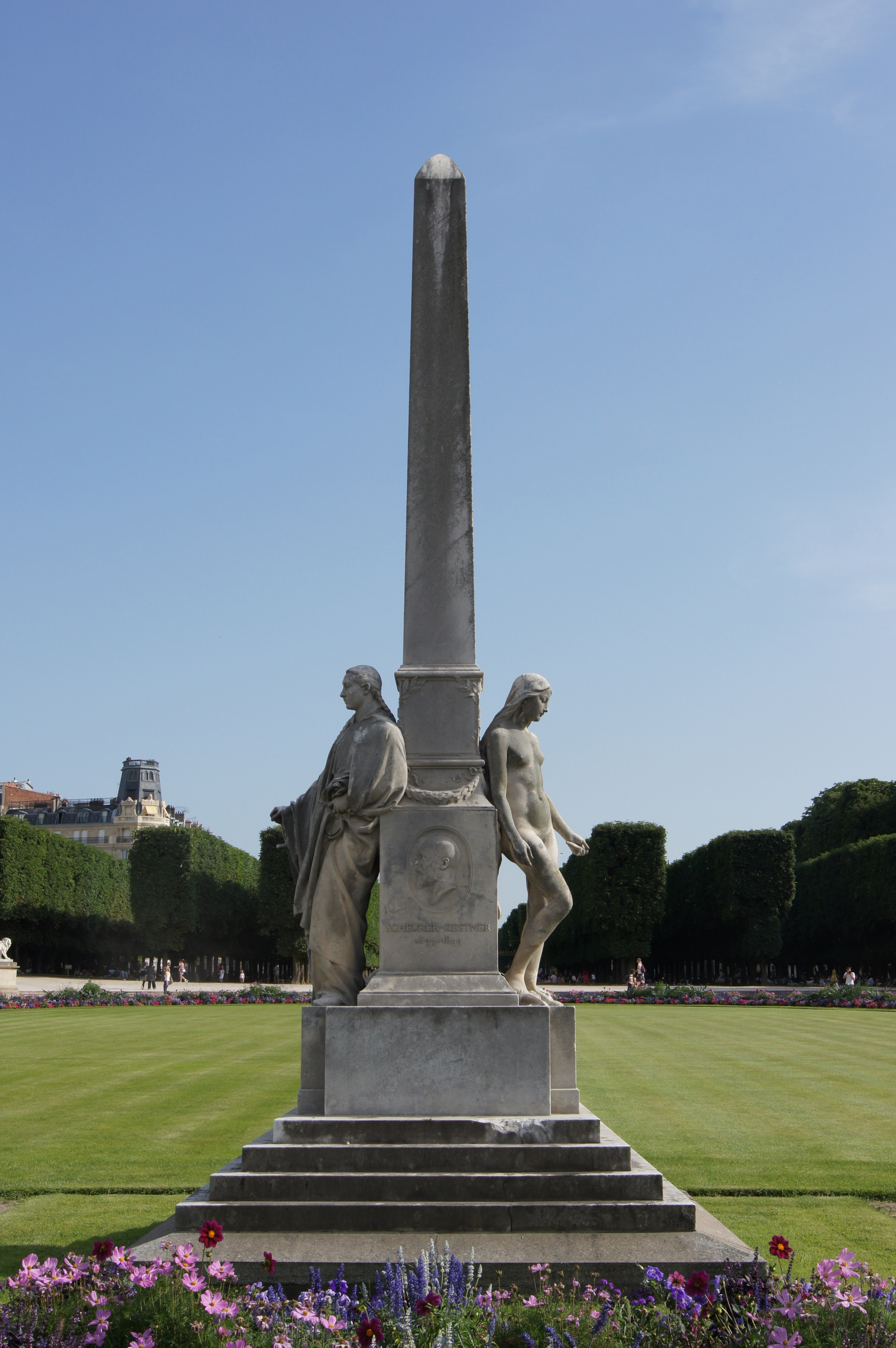
Monument to Auguste Scheurer-Kestner by Dalou, Jardin du Luxembourg, Paris

- 13 July 1906: Celebrating the Senate Auguste Scheurer-Kestner.
- 11 February 1908: The Senate inaugurates a posthumous monument by Jules Dalou in memory of Scheurer-Kestner in the Jardin du Luxembourg.
- 19 March 2007: Nearly a century after the last tribute, three delegations from the Marie Curie college of Sceaux, steeped in Paris and Scheurer-Kestner of Thann gathered to present and discuss the Dreyfus Affair.
- The School of General Education and Technology Scheurer-Kestner of Thann bears his name.
- A street in Belfort, a town in the Upper Rhine before the annexation of Alsace, bears his name.
- A square in Colmar (Upper Rhine) bears his name.
