= Bernard Lazare =

French anarchist writer (1865–1903)

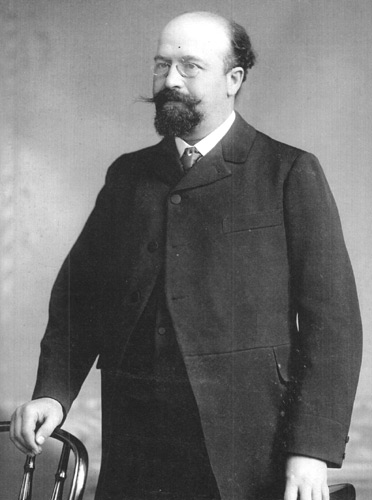
Bernard Lazare

Bernard Lazare (French pronunciation: [bɛʁnaʁ lazaʁ]; 14 June 1865, Nîmes – 1 September 1903, Paris) was a French literary critic, political journalist, polemicist, and anarchist. He is known as the first Dreyfusard.

== Life ==
He was born Lazare Marcus Manassé Bernard (he later switched his first name and last name) in Nîmes on 15 June 1865. His bourgeois family was Jewish, "steeped in religious spirit, but committed to secular values."

Lazare's initial contact with symbolists introduced him to anarchism and led to his career in literary criticism. During the Trial of the Thirty in 1894, he defended anarchists Jean Grave and Félix Fénéon.

In the spring of 1894, he published Anti-Semitism, its History and Causes (French: L'Antisémitisme, son histoire et ses causes). The book is considered antisemitic by present-day standards. According to Lazare, Jewish religion and law was partly to blame: "This is in large part the exclusivism, that is, the persisting pride and attachment of Jews to one another. ... However, the Jew, himself, constitutes only one of many causes for anti-Semitism".

It was published within a few months of the arrest of Captain Alfred Dreyfus, a Jewish army officer falsely accused of treason on the charge of communicating French military secrets to the German embassy in Paris. Having a reputation for combativeness and courage, Lazare was contacted by Mathieu Dreyfus to help prove his brother's innocence.

Lazare devoted his time exclusively to the case. Initially, he drafted a pamphlet that framed Dreyfus's trial not as a simple miscarriage of justice but the action of a specifically antisemitic conspiracy. Although that version was not published (at least in part because the family and their lawyer appear to have wanted to downplay the relevance of antisemitism to the case), Dreyfus's wrongful conviction became a turning point for Lazare's views on antisemitism, particularly regarding how Jews should respond. He began publishing more strident defenses of Jewish people in Parisian newspapers, and, after calling him out by name in Le Voltaire, even fought a duel with his former colleague, antisemitic extremist Édouard Drumont. (Neither man was injured.)

Lazare's pamphlet, Une erreur judiciaire: La vérité sur l'affaire Dreyfus ("A Judicial Error: The Truth about the Dreyfus Affair"), was finally published in November 1896 in Belgium, rather than France, because he feared it would be seized by the French police. In it, Lazare refuted the accusation point by point and demanded the sentence be overturned. The tactic conformed more to the wishes of the Dreyfus family, as the first version of the text was a savage attack on the accusers and ended with repeated use of the phrase "J'accuse", later made famous by Émile Zola. Despite the change in focus away from antisemitism, the pamphlet still argued that this was not simply a judicial mistake, but a deliberate act to frame an innocent man. Lazare may even have meant the comparatively-mild title ("Une erreur judiciare") to be ironic.

The effect was devastating for Lazare, who was ostracized by friends and colleagues from all points of the political spectrum and widely condemned in the French papers (public opinion at this point was almost universally in favour of Dreyfus's conviction). Despite the fact that the only mention of Dreyfus's Jewishness occurred in a single sentence at the end of the pamphlet—"Let it not be said that, having a Jew before us, justice was forgotten", newspapers responded with outrage that Lazare was creating an antisemitic scandal where none had previously existed. Almost every report on the pamphlet named Lazare as its author and took pains to draw attention to the fact that he himself was Jewish. Lazare would later write to Joseph Reinach: "From one day to the next, I became a pariah."

Lazare published a second much-expanded edition of the pamphlet. Nearly 300 pages long, it contained responses on the Dreyfus case from several handwriting experts. As it was now obvious that nothing could be gained from downplaying the issue of antisemitism, Lazare was free to speak his mind: "It is because he was Jewish that he was arrested, it is because he was Jewish that he was judged, it is because he was Jewish that he was condemned."

Inspired by his experience with antisemitism during the Dreyfus Affair, Lazare became engaged in the struggle for the emancipation of Jews and was triumphally received at the Second Zionist Congress in 1898. He travelled with the Zionist leader Theodor Herzl. The two men shared a great respect for each other but he fell out with Herzl after a disagreement over the project whose "tendencies, processes and actions" he disapproved. In 1899 he wrote to Herzl and by extension to the Zionist Action Committee, "You are bourgeois in thoughts, bourgeois in your feelings, bourgeois in your ideas, bourgeois in your conception of society." Lazare's Zionism was not nationalist and did advocate the creation of a state but was rather an ideal of emancipation and of collective organization of the Jewish proletarians.

He visited Romania in 1900 and 1902 after which he denounced the terrible fate of Romanian Jews in L'Aurore, written in July and August 1900. He also visited Russia, where he reported on the dangers facing Jews but did not have a chance to publish because of illness, and to Turkey, where he defended the Armenians against persecution.

Soon Dreyfusards censored him, and he could no longer write for L'Aurore after the Rennes trial. He covered the trial anyway and sent his vitriolic accounts to two American journals: The Chicago Record and The North American Review. At the end of his life, he became close to Charles Péguy and wrote in the Cahiers de la quinzaine.

== Works ==
Non-fiction

- L'Antisémitisme, son histoire et ses causes (tr. as Anti-Semitism, its History and Causes) (1894)
- Une erreur judiciaire: La vérité sur l’affaire Dreyfus ("A Judicial Error: The Truth about the Dreyfus Affair") (pamphlet, November 1896)
- Bernard Lazare, "France at the Parting of the Ways," North American Review 169, no. 516 (November 1899): 640–60.

=== Fiction ===
- Le Miroir des Légendes (Alphonse Lemarre, 1892) (tr. as The Mirror of Legends, 2017)
- Les Porteurs des Torches (1897) ( tr. as The Torch-Bearers, 2018)
- Les Portes d'ivoire (1898) (tr. as The Gates or Ivory, 2020)

== See also ==
- Anarchism in France
- Dreyfus affair
