= Armand du Paty de Clam =

French army officer and graphologist, key figure in the Dreyfus affair (1853–1916)

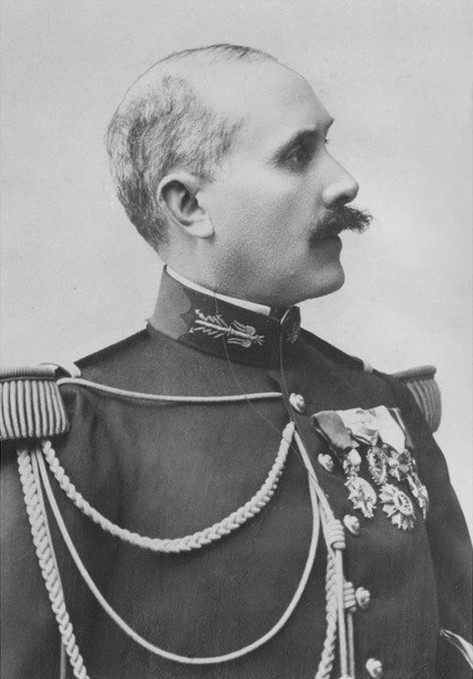
- Armand du Paty de Clam
- Born: 21 February 1853; Paris, French Second Empire
- Died: 3 September 1916 (aged 63); Versailles, French Third Republic
- Military career
- Allegiance: France
- Branch: Army of France
- Service years: 1870–1901; 1913–1916
- Rank: Lieutenant-Colonel
- Conflicts: First World War: First Battle of Marne (DOW)
- Awards: Legion of Honour

Charles Armand Auguste Ferdinand Mercier du Paty de Clam (21 February 1853 – 3 September 1916) was a French army officer, an amateur graphologist, and a key figure in the Dreyfus affair.

== Early life ==
Armand du Paty de Clam's father and grandfather were both lawyers, the latter having been President of the Court of Bordeaux. Du Paty himself turned to a military career, graduating from the military academy of Saint-Cyr in 1870. He served as an infantry officer, being promoted to lieutenant in 1874 and captain in 1877. He was assigned to the 1st Bureau of the General Staff in 1879 and then to the 3rd Bureau in 1887. In 1890 he became chef de bataillon (major), a promotion which would normally have meant returning to regimental duties. Du Paty de Clam however remained with the General Staff.

== Dreyfus affair ==
In late September 1894, French military intelligence became aware of a spy within the army through a handwritten note (the bordereau) obtained by their agent within the German embassy in Paris. Du Paty de Clam, then a major attached to the General Staff, was heavily involved in the investigation to find the spy, due principally to his expertise in graphology (handwriting analysis). A brief investigation (about 3 weeks) identified approximately half a dozen suspects; du Paty de Clam and his superior officers decided upon Captain Alfred Dreyfus, the only Jew on the General Staff, as the prime suspect. Du Paty de Clam was ordered to obtain a sample of Dreyfus's handwriting which could be used as irrefutable proof of his guilt. In mid-October 1894 an unsuspecting Dreyfus was summoned to a meeting with Major du Paty de Clam, two (civilian) police detectives and a man from French military intelligence. Feigning an injury to his writing hand, du Paty de Clam asked Dreyfus to take dictation; Paty de Clam proceeded to read out the exact words of the bordereau. Satisfied Dreyfus's writing matched that of the suspect, du Paty de Clam arrested Dreyfus immediately, transferring custody to the deputy head of French military intelligence Major Hubert-Joseph Henry, who had been waiting in the next room.

Du Paty de Clam was charged with compiling the case against Dreyfus, but failed to uncover any further evidence against him. Some highly intimidating interrogation techniques failed to extract a confession or other incriminating statements from Dreyfus himself. Extensive searches of Dreyfus's house and those belonging to his relatives also produced no meaningful evidence. Nevertheless, du Paty de Clam subsequently testified to Dreyfus's guilt at a court-martial in late December, 1894, mainly concerning the handwriting. He also handed over the infamous "secret dossier" to the judges in the case, although du Paty de Clam was unaware of its contents at the time. Du Paty de Clam was later promoted to lieutenant-colonel for his role in convicting Dreyfus.

When the conspiracy against Dreyfus began to be exposed, du Paty de Clam was involved in attempts to suppress the truth. In October 1897, as the name of the real spy (Major Ferdinand Walsin Esterhazy) began to leak, du Paty de Clam (at the direction of his superiors) met with Esterhazy, warned of the allegations against him and promised to protect him. Around the same time, du Paty de Clam was intimately involved in telegrams sent to the prime whistle-blower in the affair, Colonel Georges Picquart, designed to intimidate and threaten Picquart. In November 1897 du Paty de Clam was also involved in further threatening letters sent by Esterhazy to Picquart and the Dreyfusards' chief ally within the government, Senator Auguste Scheurer-Kestner.

Du Paty de Clam's position became precarious following the publication of Emile Zola's J'Accuse…! in January 1898, in which Zola declared "At the root of it all is one evil man, Lt. Colonel du Paty de Clam, who was at the time a mere Major. He is the entire Dreyfus case...". Following the arrest and suicide of his co-conspirator Major Henry and Esterhazy fleeing to England (both in August, 1898), the army made du Paty de Clam 'inactive' in September 1898. In March 1899 the Supreme Court of Appeals reviewed the Dreyfus case and ordered du Paty de Clam's arrest in June 1899, just prior to Dreyfus's re-trial (i.e. re-court-martial). Dreyfus reluctantly accepted a pardon in late 1899, accompanied by amnesty for all those involved in the case.

== Subsequent career and death ==
Stigmatized by his role in the affair ("a criminal craftsman of detestable work"), du Paty de Clam resigned from the army in early 1901. He successfully applied to be re-admitted to the military in 1913 as a lieutenant colonel in the Territorial Army (reserve forces). He was wounded at the First Battle of Marne in September 1914, receiving the Legion of Honour. Du Paty de Clam died from his wounds at Versailles in 1916.

His son, Charles du Paty de Clam, was appointed Commissioner-General for Jewish Affairs under the Vichy government between February and May 1944, mainly because his father had been Alfred Dreyfus's accuser.

== Personality ==
Du Paty is described by a contemporary as having a pretentious manner, being abrupt in speech and given to mechanical gestures. He was fluent in German and a cultivated lover of German music. He was a social acquaintance of the German military attaché Maximilian von Schwartzkoppen who referred to him as "having a touch of the blundering and erratic" which made him unsuited to the role required of him as a senior officer of the General Staff. A polyglot and devout Catholic, he also privately enjoyed transvestism, among other hobbies.
