= Alessandro Panizzardi =

Alessandro Panizzardi (1853–1928) was an Italian military officer of Lieutenant colonel rank. Panizzardi was associated with Maximilian von Schwartzkoppen's role in the Dreyfus affair. Later research suggests that von Schwartzkoppen and Panizzardi were involved in an intimate relationship. A book of the name Le dossier secret de l'affaire Dreyfus was published in 2007 by three French journalists. In a review of the book in Italian newspaper La Stampa, it was noted that case against Dreyfus was explicitly linked to anti-Semitism, but also to Schwartzkoppen and Panizzardis' homosexual affair.
