= L'Aurore =

French newspaper (1897–1916)

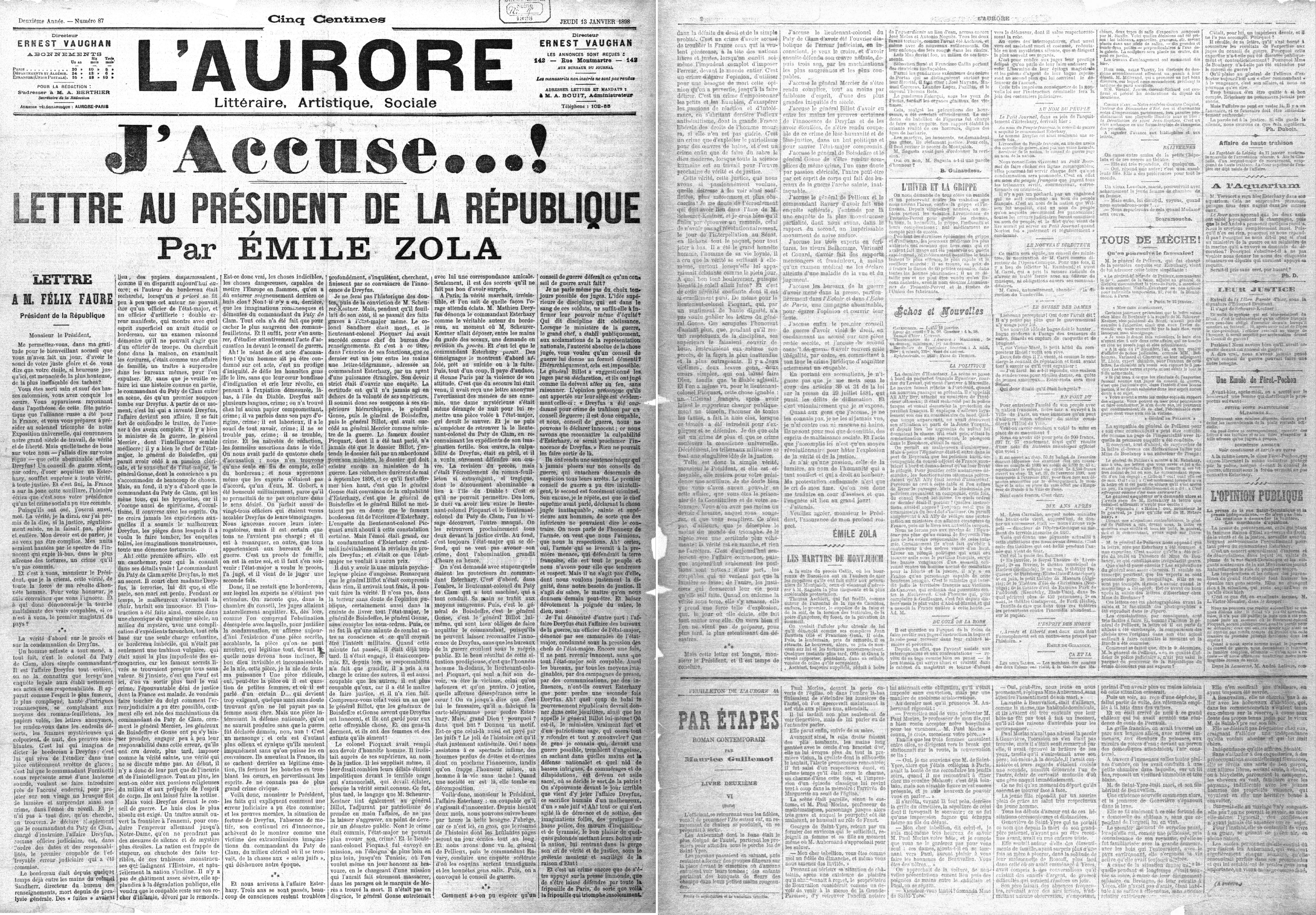
- The edition of 13 January 1898, with the J'accuse...! letter printed on the front page
- Type: Daily newspaper
- Owner: Georges Clemenceau
- Founder: Ernest Vaughan
- Founded: 1 October 1897
- Ceased publication: 2 August 1914
- Political alignment: Liberalism; Socialism; Radicalism; Republicanism
- Language: French
- City: Paris
- Country: France
- ISSN: 1255-9792

L'Aurore (French for 'The Dawn'; IPA: [loʁɔʁ]) was a literary, liberal, and socialist newspaper published in Paris, France, from 1897 to 1914. Its most famous headline was Émile Zola's J'accuse...! leading into his article on the Dreyfus Affair.

The newspaper was published by Georges Clemenceau, who later became the Prime Minister of France. Georges Mandel as a young man worked for the paper in its early years, and later was also recruited by Clemenceau to serve as his aide in government.
