= Jean-Baptiste Billot =

French general and politician (1828-1907)

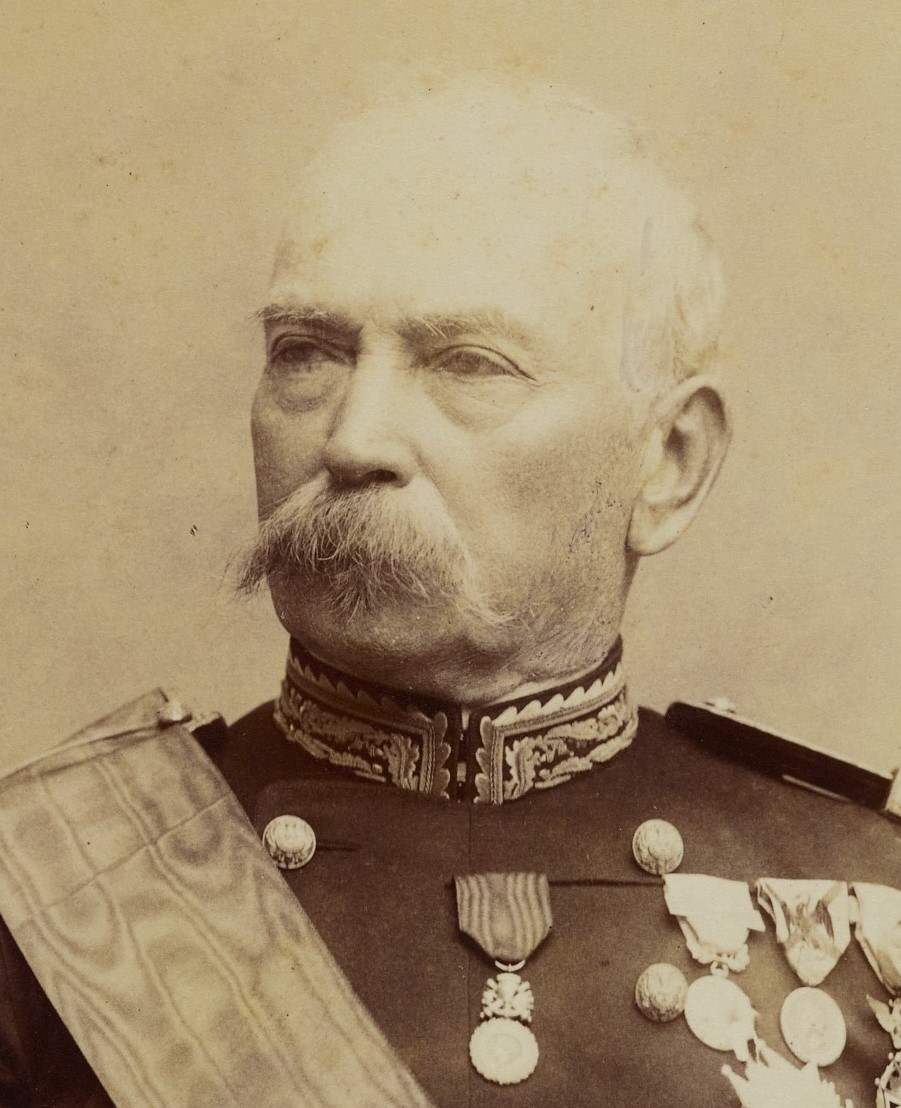
- General Jean-Baptiste Billot
- Born: 15 August 1828; Chaumeil, Corrèze, France
- Died: 31 May 1907 (aged 78); Paris, France
- Military career
- Allegiance: Second French Empire
- Branch: Army
- Service years: 1849–1888
- Rank: général de division
- Commands: state of Chihuahua (1861–1867), state of Querétaro (1861–1867), Constantine (1869), 18th Army Corps (1870), 1st Infantry Division (1879), 15th Army Corps (1880), 1st Army Corps (1884–1888)
- Conflicts: French intervention in Mexico, Franco-Prussian War (Sarrebruck, Forbach, Borny, Noiseville, Metz, Beaune-la-Rolande, Villersexel)
- Awards: Légion d'Honneur, Military Medal
- Other work: Deputy, life senator, Minister for War

Jean-Baptiste Billot (English: /biːˈjoʊ/ bee-YOH, French: [ʒɑ̃ batist bijo]; 15 August 1828 – 31 May 1907) was a French general and politician.

== Life ==
Jean-Baptiste Billot entered the École spéciale militaire de Saint-Cyr in 1847, and on leaving it in 1849 joined the staff with the rank of sous-lieutenant. His Republican convictions led to his voting no in the plebiscite of 1851 according full powers to Louis-Napoléon Bonaparte. Even so, he pursued a brilliant military career under the Second French Empire, promoted to lieutenant in 1852 then captain in 1854. He received the légion d'honneur in 1859. Billot participated in the Mexico expedition (1861–1867) : commandant of the state of Chihuahua then of Querétaro with the rank of chef d'escadrons (1863, he was mentioned 7 times in dispatches and received the cross of an officer of the légion d'honneur in 1867. He refused the post of under-secretary of state for war under emperor Maximilian. On his return to France, he made a rich marriage and in 1869 was named Chief of staff of the province of Constantine with the rank of lieutenant-colonel.

He fought in the Franco-Prussian War, at first as Chief of staff under general Laveaucoupet, commander of the 3rd Infantry Division integrated into 2nd Army Corps of general Frossard. Billot participated in the battles of Sarrebruck, Forbach where he was mentioned in dispatches, Borny and Noiseville. He managed to escape after the capture of Metz and put himself in the service of the Government of National Defence. He was promoted to colonel, then général de brigade and provisional général de division. Chief of staff then commander of the 18th Army Corps, Billot was beaten at Beaune-la-Rolande on 28 November 1870. Confirmed as permanent général de brigade, he fought in the battle of Villersexel in January 1871.

Billot was elected deputy for Corrèze in 1871 as a member of the Gauche républicaine parliamentary group, before representing this département as "sénateur inamovible" from 1875, sitting among the Republicans. Promoted to général de division in 1878, he received the command of the 1st Infantry Division in 1879, then of the 15th Army Corps, a post in which he organised the embarkation of the troops for the expedition of Tunisia from 1880 to 1881. In 1882 he was minister for war in the second ministry of Charles de Freycinet (1882), the ministry of Charles Duclerc (1882–83) and that of Jules Méline (1896–98). During his time as minister he saw the Dreyfus affair and in 1882 appointed Georges Ernest Boulanger director of infantry at the war office. He alternated military commands with political posts: vice-president of the Conseil supérieur de la Caisse des offrandes nationales and member of the Conseil supérieur for war from 1883 to 1896, commander of the 1st Army Corps from 1884 to 1888, then minister for war in the Méline government from 1896 to 1898. Grand-Cross of the Légion d'Honneur in 1896 and Médaille militaire in 1897, general Billot was also grand-cross of the order of Cambodia, then a French protectorate, in 1898 and of the order of the Crown of Romania.

He was implicated by Émile Zola of conspiracy to frame Alfred Dreyfus, a Jewish officer, for espionage in an 1898 open letter J'Accuse…!. In it Zola accuses General Billot of having held in his hands absolute proof of Dreyfus's innocence and covering it up. The case, known as the Dreyfus affair, captivated and divided France.

Political offices
Preceded by Jean-Baptiste Campenon	Minister of War; 30 January 1882 – 29 January 1883	Succeeded by Jean Thibaudin
