= Maximilian von Schwartzkoppen =

Prussian military officer (1850–1917)

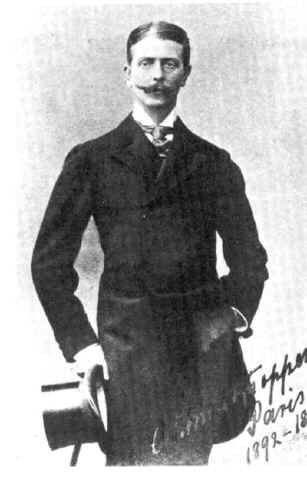
Maximilian von Schwartzkoppen, about 1895

Maximilian Friedrich Wilhelm August Leopold von Schwartzkoppen (24 February 1850 – 8 January 1917) was a Prussian military officer. After serving as an Imperial German military attaché in Paris, Schwartzkoppen was later given the rank of General of the Infantry, and held various senior commands in World War I. He is known for his role in the Dreyfus affair.

== Early life and career ==
He was born in Potsdam, Brandenburg, the son of Prussian General Emil von Schwartzkoppen (1810–1878) and his wife, Anna Marie Luise, née von Ditfurth (1816–1865). The Schwartzkoppen family, ennobled in 1688, descended from Brunswick. Schwartzkoppen joined the Prussian Army in the late 1860s and took part in the Franco-Prussian War of 1870-1871. He served as a member of the general staff with the rank of captain (Hauptmann) from 1885 to 1888 and thereupon became adjutant to Prince Ernest Louis of Hesse.

== Dreyfus affair ==
On 10 December 1891, Schwartzkoppen was appointed as military attaché at the Embassy of the German Empire in Paris, maintaining relations with the French Republic. It was his second diplomatic posting to Paris. In addition to performing formal representational and liaison duties, his subsidiary task was to obtain secret information on the French Army without the knowledge of the German ambassador resident in Paris. Instead, Schwartzkoppen reported directly and in confidence to the Director of Military Intelligence in Berlin. As a result of his spying, he became involved in the Dreyfus affair. In 1894, he received an anonymous offer for the purchase of rather insignificant military intelligence, outlined in an unsigned bordereau. (Note: The French word bordereau [bɔʁ.də.ʁo] means simply a note or slip of paper and can be applied to any note. In French, many documents in the Dreyfus case were called bordereaux (plural), but this is the one that is generally referred to in connection with the case.) The torn paper was recovered from Schwartzkoppen's wastebasket on September 25 by a cleaning woman who was a French agent and became the key evidence of Dreyfus's arrest and conviction for treason, as it was supposedly in the handwriting of Alfred Dreyfus.

Serious doubts regarding the guilt of Dreyfus were raised during his trial. Later investigations showed that Schwartzkoppen was receiving intelligence not from Dreyfus but another French officer, Ferdinand Walsin Esterhazy. Schwartzkoppen himself confirmed Dreyfus's innocence in his memoirs, which were published posthumously in 1930.

In the 1890s, Schwartzkoppen had an affair with Hermance de Weede, the wife of the Counsellor at the Dutch Embassy in Paris, and a large number of their letters were intercepted by the authorities. Also intercepted was the correspondence between Schwartzkoppen and a popular figure in Parisian diplomatic circles: the Italian military attaché, Lieutenant Colonel Count Alessandro Panizzardi. Italy and Imperial Germany were then formally linked under the Triple Alliance of 1882 and letters between the two attachés record that they freely exchanged intelligence and cooperated on espionage matters. The letters also contain bawdy comments and erotic endearments which indicate that they too were having an affair. The Schwartzkoppen and Panizzardi material was withheld from the Dreyfus defence team in 1894 but was later discussed in a closed session during the 1899 retrial. While neither officer had anything to do with Dreyfus, the correspondence lent an air of truth to other documents that were forged by prosecutors to lend retroactive credibility to Dreyfus's conviction as a spy.

Some of the forgeries even referenced the apparent affair between the two officers. In one, Panizzardi supposedly informs Schwartzkoppen that if "Dreyfus is brought in for questioning", they must both claim that they "never had any dealings with that Jew.... Clearly, no one can ever know what happened with him". The letters, real and fake, provided a convenient excuse for placing the entire Dreyfus dossier under seal because the exposure of the liaison would have "dishonoured" the German and Italian militaries and compromised diplomatic relations.

== Later life and death ==
In 1897, while the Dreyfus affair was still at its height, Schwartzkoppen was recalled from his diplomatic posting in Paris to take up command of the 2nd Kaiser Franz Grenadier Guards Regiment. In 1902, he married Luise Gräfin von Wedel with whom he subsequently had two daughters. Promoted to the rank of general in 1907, Schwartzkoppen retired from the army the following year, moving to his country estate in the Altmark.

With the outbreak of World War I in August 1914, General Schwartzkoppen returned to active service. He commanded the 233rd Infantry Brigade in France, before being appointed in 1916 to lead the 202nd Infantry Division on the Russian Front. Suffering from pneumonia, he was hospitalized in Berlin. While delirious, he reportedly blurted out, "Listen to me. Dreyfus is innocent. There is no evidence whatsoever against him". His wife, seated at his side, made a written record of this statement. Schwartzkoppen did not recover and died on 8 January 1917, aged 66.

== Personality ==
Schwartzkoppen was described as being a cultivated officer with considerable social charm; characteristics which suited him for the diplomatic and Imperial Court functions that made up much of his military career.

== Decorations and distinctions ==
Schwartzkoppen was an officer of the Kaiser's Military Suite and Colonel of the Emperor Franz Grenadier Guards Regiment. He received the decorations of Order of the Red Eagle, First Class with oak leaves; Order of the Crown, First Class; and Member of the Knights of St John.
