= List of accolades received by The Ghost Writer =

The Ghost Writer (released as The Ghost in the United Kingdom and Ireland) is a 2010 French-German-British political thriller film directed by Roman Polanski. It is based on the novel The Ghost written by Robert Harris, who co-wrote the screenplay with Polanski.

== Awards and nominations ==
Award	Date of ceremony	Category	Recipients	Result
Argentine Film Critics Association	4 July 2011	Best Foreign Film, Not in the Spanish Language	The Ghost Writer	Nominated
Berlin International Film Festival	20 February 2010	Golden Bear	The Ghost Writer	Nominated
Berlin International Film Festival	20 February 2010	Silver Bear for Best Director	Roman Polanski	Won
César Awards	25 February 2011	Best Adaptation	Robert Harris and Roman Polanski	Won
César Awards	25 February 2011	Best Cinematography	Paweł Edelman	Nominated
César Awards	25 February 2011	Best Director	Roman Polanski	Won
César Awards	25 February 2011	Best Editing	Hervé de Luze	Won
César Awards	25 February 2011	Best Film	The Ghost Writer	Nominated
César Awards	25 February 2011	Best Music Written for a Film	Alexandre Desplat	Won
César Awards	25 February 2011	Best Production Design	Albrecht Konrad	Nominated
César Awards	25 February 2011	Best Sound	Jean-Marie Blondel, Thomas Desjonquieres, Dean Humphreys	Nominated
Chlotrudis Society for Independent Films	20 March 2011	Best Adapted Screenplay	Robert Harris and Roman Polanski	Nominated
Empire Awards	27 March 2011	Best Actress	Olivia Williams	Nominated
European Film Awards	4 December 2010	Best Actor	Ewan McGregor	Won
European Film Awards	4 December 2010	Best Director	Roman Polanski	Won
European Film Awards	4 December 2010	Best Composer	Alexandre Desplat	Won
European Film Awards	4 December 2010	Best Film	The Ghost Writer	Won
European Film Awards	4 December 2010	Best Editor	Hervé de Luze	Nominated
European Film Awards	4 December 2010	Best Screenwriter	Robert Harris and Roman Polanski	Won
European Film Awards	4 December 2010	Best Production Designer	Albrecht Konrad	Won
European Film Awards	4 December 2010	People's Choice Award for Best European Film	The Ghost Writer	Nominated
Evening Standard British Film Awards	7 February 2011	Best Actor	Ewan McGregor	Nominated
Evening Standard British Film Awards	7 February 2011	Best Actress	Olivia Williams	Nominated
Evening Standard British Film Awards	7 February 2011	Best Screenplay	Robert Harris	Nominated
International Federation of Film Critics	17 September 2010	Best Film of the Year	The Ghost Writer	Won
Gaudí Awards	27 January 2011	Best European Film	The Ghost Writer	Nominated
Globo d'oro	2 July 2010	Best European Film	The Ghost Writer	Won
Globo d'oro	2 July 2010	Best Distributor	01 Distribution	Won
Goya Awards	13 February 2011	Best European Film	The Ghost Writer	Nominated
Irish Film & Television Awards	12 February 2011	Best Actor in a Supporting Role – Film	Pierce Brosnan	Won
London Film Critics' Circle	11 February 2011	British Supporting Actor of the Year	Pierce Brosnan	Nominated
London Film Critics' Circle	11 February 2011	British Supporting Actress of the Year	Olivia Williams	Won
Los Angeles Film Critics Association	12 December 2010	Best Music	Alexandre Desplat	Won
Nastro d'Argento	19 June 2010	Best European Director	Roman Polanski	Nominated
National Board of Review of Motion Pictures	2 December 2010	Top Independent Films	The Ghost Writer	Won
National Society of Film Critics	8 January 2011	Best Supporting Actress	Olivia Williams	Won
Polish Film Awards	7 March 2011	Best European Film	The Ghost Writer	Won
Lumière Awards	14 January 2011	Best Director	Roman Polanski	Won
Lumière Awards	14 January 2011	Best Film	The Ghost Writer	Nominated
Lumière Awards	14 January 2011	Best Screenplay	Robert Harris and Roman Polanski	Won
Satellite Award	19 December 2010	Best Adapted Screenplay	Robert Harris and Roman Polanski	Nominated
Satellite Award	19 December 2010	Best Director	Roman Polanski	Nominated
Satellite Award	19 December 2010	Best Motion Picture – Drama	The Ghost Writer	Nominated
Satellite Award	19 December 2010	Best Supporting Actor – Motion Picture	Pierce Brosnan	Nominated
University of Southern California	4 February 2011	USC Scripter Award	Robert Harris and Roman Polanski	Nominated
World Soundtrack Academy	23 October 2010	Soundtrack Composer of the Year	Alexandre Desplat	Won
San Sebastián Film Festival	17 September 2010 – 25 September 2010	FIPRESCI Grand Prix	The Ghost Writer	Won
