= An Officer and a Spy =

An Officer and a Spy may refer to:

- An Officer and a Spy (novel), a 2013 historical novel by Robert Harris
- An Officer and a Spy (film), a 2019 historical drama film based on the novel
