= The Thief (1997 film) =

- Directed by: Pavel Chukhray
- Written by: Pavel Chukhray
- Produced by: Igor Bortnikov; Sergei Kozlov; Igor Tolstunov
- Starring: Vladimir Mashkov; Yekaterina Rednikova; Misha Philipchuk
- Cinematography: Vladimir Klimov
- Edited by: Marina Dobryanskaya; Natalya Kucherenko
- Music by: Vladimir Dashkevich
- Release date: 1997
- Running time: 96 minutes
- Country: Russia
- Language: Russian
- Budget: $2 million
- Box office: $1.1 million (US)

The Thief (Russian: Вор, Vor) is a 1997 Russian drama film written and directed by Pavel Chukhray. It was nominated for the Academy Award for Best Foreign Language Film and won the Nika Award for Best Picture and Best Directing. Also winner of the International Youth Jury's prize, the President of the Italian Senate's gold medal, and the UNICEF Award at the 1997 Venice Film Festival.

The film is about a young woman, Katya (Yekaterina Rednikova), and her 6-year-old son Sanya (Misha Philipchuk), who, in 1952, meet a veteran Soviet officer named Tolyan (Vladimir Mashkov). Katya falls in love with Tolyan, who turns out to be a small time criminal, but who also becomes a father figure to Sanya.

== Plot ==
Katya, a destitute widow, and her young son Sanya struggle to survive in the post-war Soviet Union from the late 1940s to the early 1950s. Sanya was born in 1946, after his father's death, leaving Katya to raise him alone. Though Sanya never knew his father, he often imagines his presence. In 1952, they encounter Tolyan, a charming officer, who seduces Katya. She falls in love with him, and they begin living together, with Tolyan posing as her husband and a father figure to Sanya.

Initially resistant, Sanya gradually grows fond of Tolyan, finding solace and protection in him. However, Katya harbors doubts about Tolyan's authoritarian behavior and mysterious past. Unbeknownst to her, Tolyan sustains the family through dubious means, exploiting his connections to deceive and steal from others.

As time passes, Katya and Sanya witness Tolyan's darker side, straining their relationship. Matters worsen when Tolyan fails to reciprocate Sanya's affection. Despite this, they cling to the hope of their makeshift family. Tragedy strikes when Katya succumbs to complications from a botched abortion.

Left alone, Sanya desperately awaits Tolyan's return, only to discover his true nature as a career criminal when he's arrested and imprisoned. Years later, Sanya encounters Tolyan again, hoping for reconciliation, but is met with rejection. Heartbroken, Sanya takes matters into his own hands, confronting Tolyan, resulting in a fatal confrontation fueled by betrayal and despair.

== Cast ==
- Vladimir Mashkov as Tolyan
- Yekaterina Rednikova as Katya
- Misha Philipchuk as Sanya (as Misha Filipchuk)
- Amaliya Mordvinova as the doctor's wife
- Lidiya Savchenko as Baba Tanya
- Yuliya Artamonova as the engineer's wife
- Yury Belyayev as Sanya (at 48 years old)
- Dmitri Chigaryov as Sanya (at 12 years old)
- Anton Tabakov (as A. Tabakov)

== Reception ==
=== Critical response ===
The Thief has an approval rating of 88% on review aggregator website Rotten Tomatoes, based on 24 reviews, and an average rating of 7/10.The website's critical consensus states,"As beautiful to look at as it is thought-provoking, The Thief interrogates Europe's past through the experiences of a family in crisis".

=== Awards and nominations ===
==== Won ====
- Sozvezdie 1997:
  - Best Actor – Vladimir Mashkov
- Venice Film Festival 1997:
  - Prize of the International Youth Jury – Pavel Chukhray
  - President of the Italian Senate's Gold Medal – Pavel Chukhray
  - UNICEF Award – Pavel Chukhray
- Open CIS and Baltik Film Festival 1997:
  - Best Actor – Vladimir Mashkov
  - Best Director – Pavel Chukhray
  - Prize of the Distributors Jury – Pavel Chukhray
- Nika Awards 1998:
  - Best Actor – Vladimir Mashkov
  - Best Actress – Ekaterina Rednikova
  - Best Director – Pavel Chukhray
  - Best Film – Pavel Chukhray and Igor Tolstunov
  - Best Music – Vladimir Dashkevich
- Young Artist Award 1998:
  - Best Young Performer in a Foreign Film – Misha Philipchuk

==== Nominated ====
- Venice Film Festival 1997:
  - Golden Lion – Pavel Chukhray
- European Film Awards 1997:
  - Best Film – Igor Tolstunov
- Golden Globe Award
  - Golden Globe for Best Foreign Language Film – Russia
- Academy Award 1998:
  - Oscar Award for Best Foreign Language Film – Russia
- Nika Awards 1998:
  - Best Cinematographer – Vladimir Klimov
  - Best Costume Designer – Natalya Moneva
  - Best Production Designer – Viktor Petrov
  - Best Screenplay – Pavel Chukhray
  - Best Sound – Yuliya Yegorova
- Goya Awards 1999:
  - Best European Film – Pavel Chukhray

== See also ==
- List of submissions to the 70th Academy Awards for Best Foreign Language Film
- List of Russian submissions for the Academy Award for Best Foreign Language Film
