= Archangel (Harris novel) =

1998 novel by Robert Harris

- First edition
- Author: Robert Harris
- Language: English
- Publisher: Hutchinson
- Publication date: 1998
- Publication place: United Kingdom
- Media type: Print (hardback and paperback)
- Pages: 432
- ISBN: 0-09-928241-0
- OCLC: 41619497

Archangel is a novel by Robert Harris set in modern Russia. It was published in 1998 and adapted for television by the BBC in 2005.

== Plot summary ==
While attending a conference in Moscow, the historian Christopher "Fluke" Kelso is met by an old man named Papu Rapava, who claims to have been present at the death of Joseph Stalin. Immediately after Stalin's death, Lavrenty Beria supposedly took measures to secure a black notebook, which is believed to be Stalin's secret diary. Rapava spent years in Kolyma after the authorities tried to extract the book's location from him, but he has never revealed it though he knows that shadowy agents are still watching him in case he goes near the mysterious thing.

Kelso eventually locates the notebook, which Rapava had left to his daughter just before he was recaptured and tortured to death. It proves to be the memoirs of a young girl chosen by Stalin to be the mother of his secret heir. Following the trail to the remote northern city of Arkhangelsk, Kelso comes face to face with Stalin's son.

Raised in a log cabin filled with Stalin's personal effects, writings and recorded speeches, the son is a physical and ideological copy of his father. It is revealed that he had murdered the husband-and-wife KGB agents who had raised him from infancy when he decided they were untrustworthy. Young Stalin has been told that he would be sent for when it was time for him to assume control of his country, and he believes that Kelso is the promised messenger.

Stalin overcomes a special forces unit sent to eliminate him, which alarms Kelso by his ruthless and dispassionate use of violence, and he boards a train headed for Moscow. At each station, ever-larger crowds gather to witness the apparent resurrection of the famous dictator, and it appears that he might be able simply to stride through the doors of the Kremlin and assume command.

As he steps off the train in Moscow, Rapava's daughter, who has made her way into the crowd at the railway station, takes out her father's pistol. The novel ends there.

== Television adaptation ==
Screenwriters Dick Clement and Ian La Frenais purchased the rights and hoped to make a film version but were unable to find sufficient backing. In the event, they wrote a three-part television version starring Daniel Craig, Yekaterina Rednikova, Gabriel Macht, and Avtandil Makharadze as Joseph Stalin. The adaptation was screened on BBC One in March 2005. The director was Jon Jones, and the adaptation was produced by Christopher Hall for the BBC's own in-house drama department, in collaboration with the independent production company Power and Baltic Film Services. It was filmed partly on location in Moscow, and also in Riga, Latvia. Later in the year, it was released on DVD.
