= Munich – The Edge of War =

2021 period spy thriller film by Christian Schwochow

- Promotional poster
- Directed by: Christian Schwochow
- Screenplay by: Ben Power
- Based on: Munich by Robert Harris
- Produced by: Andrew Eaton
- Starring: George MacKay; Jannis Niewöhner; Jeremy Irons; Sandra Hüller; Liv Lisa Fries; August Diehl; Jessica Brown Findlay; Anjli Mohindra; Ulrich Matthes
- Cinematography: Frank Lamm
- Edited by: Jens Klüber
- Music by: Isobel Waller-Bridge
- Production company: Turbine Studios
- Distributed by: Netflix
- Release dates: 13 October 2021 (LFF); 14 January 2022 (United Kingdom); 21 January 2022 (Netflix)
- Running time: 131 minutes
- Countries: United Kingdom; Germany
- Languages: English; German

Munich – The Edge of War is a 2021 period spy thriller film directed by Christian Schwochow, from a screenplay by Ben Power. It is based upon the 2017 novel Munich by Robert Harris. The film stars George MacKay, Jannis Niewöhner and Jeremy Irons.

Munich – The Edge of War had its world premiere at the BFI London Film Festival on 13 October 2021, and was released in a limited number of cinemas on 14 January 2022, before its streaming release on 21 January 2022, by Netflix.

== Plot ==
In 1932, Hugh Legat, and his German friends Paul von Hartmann and Paul's girlfriend Lena celebrate their graduation from Oxford University. Hartmann insists Legat visit him in Munich to experience the "New Germany".

Six years later, Legat is on secondment from the British Foreign Office; working as Prime Minister Neville Chamberlain's private secretary. Europe is on the brink of war. Chamberlain strives to obtain peace with Adolf Hitler at any cost, even if that means allowing Germany to seize control of the Sudetenland from Czechoslovakia. Chamberlain writes to Benito Mussolini in an effort to halt military action; it seemingly works and Hitler agrees, inviting Chamberlain and French Prime Minister Édouard Daladier to Munich for a conference.

Meanwhile, Hartmann is working as a translator in the German Ministry of Foreign Affairs in Berlin while secretly plotting with a Wehrmacht general in an effort to overthrow Hitler if top army officials agree to arrest him and seize control. The general believes this cannot be accomplished unless Hitler is allowed to invade the Sudetenland, while Hartmann doubts the collective resolve of the generals. Hartmann is given a stolen document (the Hossbach Memorandum) by his lover, Helen Winter, that indicates Hitler intends to conquer Europe. Hartmann and the others reconvene and agree that getting the information to Chamberlain while he is in Munich is their best option; Hartmann reveals he has a trusted former classmate, Legat, who can likely help. Hartmann is handed a pistol to assassinate Hitler should the opportunity arise.

In London, Legat is approached by Sir Alexander Cadogan and Sir Stewart Menzies of MI6 regarding the document in Hartmann's possession. It is suggested that Legat accompany Chamberlain to the conference, rendezvous with Hartmann, and retrieve the document. He agrees to help, despite the dangers associated with espionage. Legat convinces Chamberlain to bring him along to Munich as a translator.

Hartmann boards Hitler's train to Munich, where he shares his compartment with a childhood friend, Franz Sauer, a member of the Führerbegleitkommando. Upon discovering that Sauer travels with him, Hartmann hides the documents and gun in the compartment washroom. Hartmann catches Sauer rummaging through his suitcase, and realizes that Sauer has become suspicious of him. Later, Hartmann meets with Hitler.

In Munich, Legat and Hartmann reunite, and a flashback reveals they had a falling out in 1932 after a heated verbal argument related to Hartmann's then-support of the Nazi Party. Legat agrees to take possession of the document, but is unable to pass it along to Chamberlain. With the signing of the agreement imminent, Hartmann insists that they immediately present the argument to Chamberlain and convince him to not sign the Munich Agreement. Legat and Hartmann meet with Chamberlain, who scoffs at the idea of not signing based on vague German military plans for a coup d'état and refuses to take action. Hartmann takes Legat to a local nursing home to see Lena, revealing that in 1935 she was arrested at an anti-Nazi rally and sent to a concentration camp, only to have a Star of David carved in her back and be thrown out of a window after she was found to be Jewish, resulting in paralysis and an inability to speak. Hartmann reveals he intends to assassinate Hitler, much to Legat's dismay. When Legat returns to his hotel, he finds his room has been ransacked by Sauer, who attacks him. Legat discovers the document is gone and panics, but he is able to get a discreet message to Hartmann informing him. Hartmann meets with Hitler but cannot bring himself to shoot him. The Munich Agreement is signed.

As Legat enters the car bound for the airport, typist Joan Menzies reveals that she is the niece of Colonel Sir Stewart Menzies, and that she had been assigned to help Legat in his espionage activity; she took possession of the document to prevent Sauer from finding it. Chamberlain returns to Britain and gives his famous "Peace for our time" speech. Legat returns home to his wife and son, revealing that he plans to leave the diplomatic service and join the RAF. The Munich Agreement ultimately fails and World War II begins. Chamberlain resigns several months later, dying soon after. But because of the signed agreement, the start of the war is postponed, allowing Britain more time to prepare. Eventually, the Allies of World War II win the war.

== Cast ==
- George MacKay as Hugh Legat
- Jannis Niewöhner as Paul von Hartmann
- Jeremy Irons as Neville Chamberlain
- Alex Jennings as Sir Horace Wilson
- Sandra Hüller as Helen Winter
- Liv Lisa Fries as Lena
- August Diehl as Franz Sauer
- Jessica Brown Findlay as Pamela Legat
- Anjli Mohindra as Joan Menzies
- Ulrich Matthes as Adolf Hitler
- Mark Lewis Jones as Sir Osmund Cleverly
- Abigail Cruttenden as Anne Chamberlain
- Robert Bathurst as Sir Nevile Henderson
- Nicholas Farrell as Sir Alexander Cadogan
- Richard Dillane as Sir Stewart Menzies
- Martin Kiefer as Heinrich Himmler
- Domenico Fortunato as Benito Mussolini (non-speaking)
- Stéphane Boucher as Édouard Daladier (non-speaking)
- Marc Limpach as Dr. Paul Schmidt
- Rainer Sellien as Hans Oster

== Production ==
In November 2020, it was announced Jeremy Irons, George MacKay, Jannis Niewöhner, Sandra Hüller, Liv Lisa Fries and August Diehl had joined the cast of the film, with Christian Schwochow directing the film, from a screenplay by Ben Power, based upon the novel of the same name by Robert Harris, with Netflix set to distribute.

Principal photography began in October 2020 and ended in December 2020. Filming took place in Berlin, Potsdam, Munich and Liverpool. The working title was Munich 38.

== Revisionism and historical accuracy ==
Although the main characters are fictionalized for plot development, the author and film have given Chamberlain a more sympathetic role in the build-up to World War II. Often deemed a coward for his "appeasement" of Hitler, some modern historians have taken the view that the Munich Conference was a stalling tactic to allow Britain to prepare for an inevitable war with Nazi Germany. The film itself portrays the conference as a "best case, worst case" scenario. In the best case, Hitler would cease his planned invasion of Czechoslovakia. In the worst case, the letter of agreement would give Britain time to consolidate allies, rearm the military and perhaps get the United States involved.

== Reception ==
On the review aggregator website Rotten Tomatoes, 83% of 87 critics' reviews are positive, with an average rating of 6.7/10. The website's consensus reads: "Sharp direction and some outstanding performances make Munich: The Edge of War a gripping historical drama, even though the ending's no secret." Metacritic, which uses a weighted average, assigned the film a score of 53 out of 100, based on 20 critics, indicating "mixed or average" reviews.
