= Fear index =

- Fear Index - common name for the Chicago Board Options Exchange Market Volatility Index, ticker symbol VIX, measuring the implied volatility of S&P 500 index options
- The Fear Index - a 2011 novel by British author Robert Harris
  - The Fear Index, a 2022 UK TV series based on Harris's novel, produced by Sky TV
