= The Ghost Writer (film) =

2010 film by Roman Polanski

- US film poster
- Directed by: Roman Polanski
- Screenplay by: Robert Harris; Roman Polanski
- Based on: The Ghost by Robert Harris
- Produced by: Roman Polanski; Robert Benmussa; Alain Sarde
- Starring: Ewan McGregor; Pierce Brosnan; Kim Cattrall; Olivia Williams; Tom Wilkinson; Timothy Hutton; Jon Bernthal; David Rintoul; Robert Pugh; Eli Wallach; Jim Belushi
- Cinematography: Paweł Edelman
- Edited by: Hervé de Luze
- Music by: Alexandre Desplat
- Distributed by: Optimum Releasing (United Kingdom); Pathé Distribution (France and Switzerland); Kinowelt Filmverleih (Germany)
- Release dates: 12 February 2010 (Berlin Film Festival); 18 February 2010 (Germany); 3 March 2010 (France); 16 April 2010 (United Kingdom)
- Running time: 128 minutes
- Countries: United Kingdom; France; Germany
- Language: English
- Budget: €30.8 million / $45 million
- Box office: $60.3 million

The Ghost Writer (released as The Ghost in the United Kingdom and Ireland) is a 2010 neo-noir political thriller film directed by Roman Polanski. The film is an adaptation of the 2007 novel, The Ghost, by Robert Harris with the screenplay written by Polanski and Harris. It stars Ewan McGregor in the title role with Pierce Brosnan, Kim Cattrall, and Olivia Williams.

The film was a critical success but a modest commercial success. It won numerous cinematic awards including Best Director for Polanski at the 60th Berlin International Film Festival and also at the 23rd European Film Awards in 2010.

== Plot ==
A British ghostwriter is hired by London-based publishing firm Rhinehart, Inc. to complete the autobiography of former British Prime Minister Adam Lang after the original ghost, Lang's aide Mike McAra, dies in an apparent drowning accident. The Ghost travels to Old Haven on Martha's Vineyard, where Lang and his wife Ruth are staying at a complex with Lang's personal assistant, Amelia Bly. As Lang's time as prime minister is marred by his involvement in the war on terror, the Ghost encounters anti-war demonstrators and activists who are protesting Lang's presence on the island.

As the Ghost works on the book, former British Foreign Secretary Richard Rycart accuses Lang of authorizing the extraordinary rendition of terrorists. Lang faces prosecution by the International Criminal Court if he leaves the United States and is rushed to Washington, DC, for PR, while the Ghost finds a hidden envelope under a clothes drawer. The envelope contains photographs that contradict Lang's claims about his past, including that he and Ruth met at Cambridge University, and the personal phone number of Rycart.

The Ghost probes the death of McAra and investigates the shore where his body was found, where he is told by a resident the tides would not deposit a body on the beach. The Ghost grows more suspicious when Ruth reveals that Lang and McAra argued the night before he died. The Ghost uses McAra's old car to return to his hotel, but instead follows pre-programmed directions on the car's satellite navigation system, which takes him to the Belmont home of Harvard Professor Paul Emmett. The Ghost questions Emmett, who denies ever having met McAra and having only a cursory acquaintance with Lang, becoming more evasive when the Ghost presents him with evidence that shows otherwise.

The Ghost attempts to return to Martha's Vineyard, but remains on the mainland when he is followed to the ferry. With no one else to turn to, he phones Rycart for help, who agrees to a meeting. The Ghost researches links between Emmett, a military contractor, and the CIA. Rycart reveals McAra discovered Lang's involvement in so-called "torture flights", in which terrorist suspects were tortured while airborne on private planes. In regard to Emmett's relationship with Lang, Rycart recounts how Lang's decisions as Prime Minister uniformly benefited US interests, and says McAra found new evidence that he supposedly wrote about in the "beginning of the manuscript", but they find nothing written in the early pages.

Bly contacts the Ghost, offering to have him flown back to Old Haven aboard Lang's private executive jet on its return from DC. Rycart encourages him to do so, where on board Lang angrily refutes the Ghost's suggestion he was recruited as a CIA agent by Emmett. When the plane lands in Old Haven, Lang is assassinated by an activist, and the Ghost is subsequently asked to complete the book for posthumous publication. At the book's launch in London, the Ghost learns that Emmett tutored Ruth when she was at Harvard. After Bly mentions the "beginnings" of the original manuscript, the Ghost inspects the first word of each chapter, discovering the message: "Lang's wife Ruth was recruited as a CIA agent by Professor Paul Emmett of Harvard University." The Ghost passes a note to Ruth revealing his discovery; perturbed, Ruth attempts to confront the Ghost, but he leaves the building and attempts to flag down a taxi in the street, when a car accelerates in his direction, a crash is heard, and the pages of the manuscript scatter in the wind.

== Cast ==
- Ewan McGregor as the Ghost, the unnamed ghostwriter
- Pierce Brosnan as Adam Lang, a former British Prime Minister
- Kim Cattrall as Amelia Bly, Lang's personal assistant
- Olivia Williams as Ruth Lang, Lang's wife
- Tom Wilkinson as Paul Emmett, a professor at Harvard Law School
- Timothy Hutton as Sidney Kroll, Lang's American lawyer
- Jon Bernthal as Rick Ricardelli, the ghostwriter's agent
- Tim Preece as Roy Quigley, managing director of Rhinehart's London business
- Robert Pugh as Richard Rycart, UN Envoy and former British Foreign Secretary
- David Rintoul as the Stranger, a grieving father who lost his son during the war in Afghanistan
- Eli Wallach as the Old Man at Martha's Vineyard
- James Belushi as John Maddox, Rhinehart's New York executive
- Milton Welsh as Taxi Driver
- Julia Kratz as Woman with Bullseye
- Errol Shaker as Mainland Ferry Al
- Eben Young as FBI Agent #1
- Alister Mazzotti as Protection Officer
- Talin Lopez as C.I.A. Agent on train
- Errol Trotman-Harewood as C.I.A. Agent on train #2
- Jeff Burrell as Frank
- John Keogh as Protection Officer #2
- Clayton Nemrow as Journalist
- Mo Asumang as US Secretary of State
- Anna Botting as SKY TV Newsreader
- Regine Hentschel as Diner Waitress
- Robert Seelinger as CNN Newscaster
- Morgane Polanski as Hotel Receptionist
- Desiree Erasmus as Nancy Emmett
- Soogi Kang as Dep
- Tim Faraday as Barry
- Michael S. Ruscheinsky as CNN Reporter
- Angelique Fernandez as War Crime Prosecutor
- Jaymes Butler as FBI Agent #2
- Kate Copeland as Alice
- Nyasha Hatendi as Josh
- Marianne Graffam as Lucy
- Daphne Alexander as Connie

== Production ==
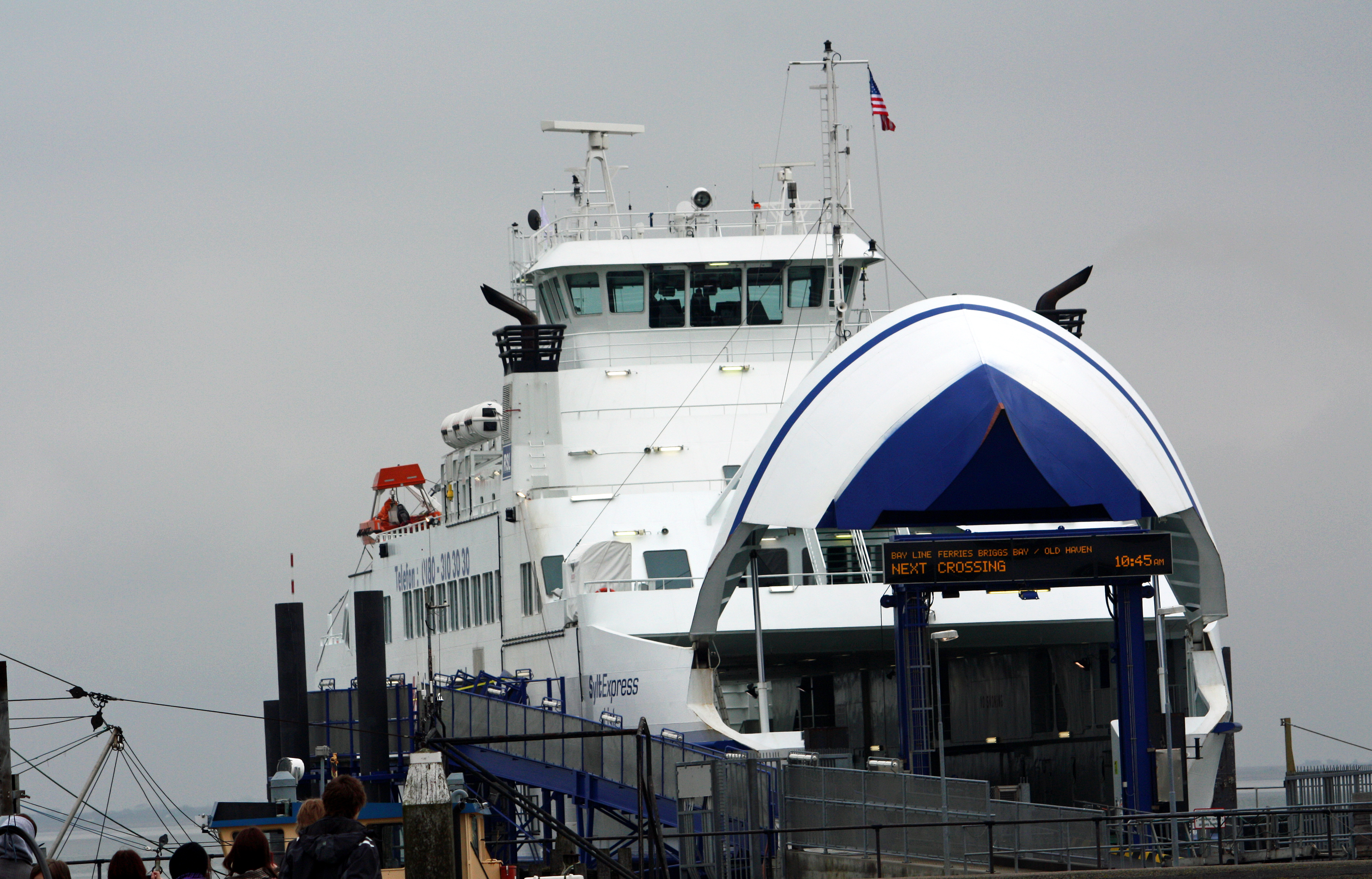
The North Sea ferry MS SyltExpress that was used as the Martha's Vineyard ferry in the film

Polanski had originally teamed with Robert Harris for a film of Harris's novel Pompeii, but the project was cancelled because of the looming actors' strike that autumn.

Polanski and Harris then turned to Harris's recent best seller, The Ghost. They co-wrote a script and in November 2007, just after the book's release, Polanski announced filming for autumn 2008. In June 2008, Nicolas Cage, Pierce Brosnan, Tilda Swinton and Kim Cattrall were announced as the stars. Production was then postponed by a number of months, with Ewan McGregor and Olivia Williams replacing Cage and Swinton, respectively, as a result.

The film finally began production in February 2009 in Germany, at the Babelsberg Studios in Potsdam. Germany stood in for London and Martha's Vineyard. The majority of exteriors, set on Martha's Vineyard, were shot on the island of Sylt in the North Sea, and on the ferry MS SyltExpress. The harbor exterior were shot on both the German island of Sylt, and the Danish island of Rømø. The exterior set of the house where much of the film takes place, however, was built on the island of Usedom, in the Baltic Sea. Exteriors and interiors set at a publishing house in London were shot at Charlottenstrasse 47 in downtown Berlin (Mitte), while Strausberg Airport near Berlin stood in for the Vineyard airport. A few brief exterior shots for driving scenes were shot by a second unit in Massachusetts, without Polanski or the actors.

On his way to the Zurich Film Festival, Polanski was arrested by Swiss police in September 2009 at the request of the US and held for extradition. Due to Polanski's arrest, post-production was briefly put on hold, but he resumed and completed work from house arrest at his Swiss villa. He was unable to participate in the film's world premiere at the Berlinale festival on 12 February 2010.

=== Non-fictional allusions ===
Pierce Brosnan plays the character of Adam Lang, who has echoes of former British Prime Minister Tony Blair. The character is linked to the 2003 invasion of Iraq, the war on terror and the special relationship with the United States. The author of the book on which the film is based has said he was inspired at least in part by anger toward Blair's policies, and called for him to face war crimes trials.

Robert Pugh, who portrayed the former British Foreign Secretary, Richard Rycart, and Mo Asumang, who played the US Secretary of State, both physically resemble their real-life counterparts, Robin Cook and Condoleezza Rice. Like the fictional Rycart, Cook had foreign policy differences with the British Prime Minister. The old man living on Martha's Vineyard is a reference to Robert McNamara.

== Release ==
The film premièred at the 60th Berlin International Film Festival on 12 February 2010, and was widely released throughout much of Europe during the following four weeks. It went on general release in the US on 19 March 2010 and in the UK on 16 April 2010.

For the US theatrical release, the dialogue was censored and re-dubbed with tamer language in order to meet the Motion Picture Association's qualifications for a PG-13 rating. The censored PG-13 version was later used for the US DVD and Blu-ray releases while the uncensored version was retained for most international DVD and Blu-ray releases.

== Reception ==
=== Box office ===
The film achieved only modest success, grossing $60.3 million against a budget of $45 million.

=== Critical response ===
The film has received positive reviews from critics. Review aggregator Rotten Tomatoes reported that 84% of critics gave positive reviews based on a sample of 210 reviews with an average rating of 7.4/10. The website's critics consensus reads, "While it may lack the revelatory punch of Polanski's finest films, Ghost Writer benefits from stylish direction, a tense screenplay, and a strong central performance from Ewan McGregor." Another review aggregator, Metacritic, gave the film an average rating of 77% based on 35 reviews. At the end of the year, the film placed at #4 in both Film Comment and The Village Voice's annual critics' polls.

Critic Andrew Sarris wrote that the film "constitutes a miracle of artistic and psychological resilience." Roger Ebert gave the film a full four stars and declared it was "the work of a man who knows how to direct a thriller." Ebert included the film in his Best Films of 2010 list. Jim Hoberman of The Village Voice placed the film at #3 on his year-end list and wrote that "The Pianist had its moments, but Polanski hasn't made a movie so sustained in the decades since The Tenant or even 1966's Cul de Sac." Jonathan Rosenbaum would later write that "The Ghost Writer is easily Polanski's best film since Bitter Moon, and certainly his most masterful." Political analyst William Bradley dubbed it "one of the best films I've seen in recent years" in a review for The Huffington Post that dealt with the film's artistic and political dimensions. The Guardian said "Roman Polanski's deft take on Robert Harris's political thriller is the director's most purely enjoyable film for years."

However, John Rentoul from the UK's The Independent, who describes himself as an "ultra Blairite with a slavish admiration for Tony", and John Rosenthal, from the conservative Pajamas Media, both denounced the film because it was made with financial support from the German government. Rentoul also criticized Polanski, describing the film as "propaganda" and a "Blair hating movie".

Keith Uhlich of Time Out New York named The Ghost Writer the second-best film of 2010, describing it as "what an expertly executed thriller is supposed to be."

== Awards ==
The movie has won numerous awards, particularly for Roman Polanski as director, Ewan McGregor in the lead role, and Olivia Williams as Ruth Lang.

== See also ==
- Film à clef
- The Ghost Writer (soundtrack)
- 2010 in film
- List of British films of 2010
- List of films set in New England
- List of fictional prime ministers of the United Kingdom
- Lists of thriller films
- London in film
- Roman de Gare (France, 2006), by Claude Lelouch (who appears as Hervé Picard), also about a ghost writer.
