= List of films set in New England =

This is a list of films set in New England. Movies made for television are not included.

This list is incomplete. Please make an annotation describing something about the setting.

== 1910s ==
- The House of the Seven Gables (1910) – set in Salem, Massachusetts
- The Scarlet Letter (1911)

== 1920s ==
- The Sea Beast (1926)
- The Scarlet Letter (1926)
- The Yankee Clipper (1927)

== 1930s ==
- Abraham Lincoln (1930)
- Moby Dick (1930)
- A Connecticut Yankee (1931)
- Horse Feathers (1932)
- Doctor Bull (1933)
- Little Women (1933) – set in Concord, Massachusetts
- The Pursuit of Happiness (1934)
- The Scarlet Letter (1934)
- Ah, Wilderness! (1935) -–set in an unnamed New England town, filmed in Grafton, Massachusetts
- Way Down East (1935)
- Mr. Deeds Goes to Town (1936)
- Captains Courageous (1937)
- Maid of Salem (1937)
- Nothing Sacred (1937)
- Stella Dallas (1937)
- Bringing Up Baby (1938) – they visit Susan's aunt in Connecticut
- Mother Carey's Chickens (1938)
- Dark Victory (1939)
- The Story of Alexander Graham Bell (1939)

== 1940s ==
- The House of the Seven Gables (1940) – set in Salem, Massachusetts
- The Devil and Daniel Webster (1941)
- Yankee Doodle Dandy (1942)
- The Loves of Edgar Allan Poe (1942)
- Holiday Inn (1942) – Connecticut
- The Mummy's Tomb (1942)
- I Married a Witch (1942)
- The Adventures of Mark Twain (1944)
- The Mummy's Ghost (1944)
- Christmas in Connecticut (1945)
- Leave Her to Heaven (1945)
- Spellbound (1945)
- The Thin Man Goes Home (1945)
- Dragonwyck (1946)
- The Spiral Staircase (1946)
- The Stranger (1946)
- The Strange Woman (1946)
- Boomerang (1947)
- Gentleman's Agreement (1947)
- Mourning Becomes Electra (1947)
- Mr. Blandings Builds His Dream House (1948) – Connecticut
- The Babe Ruth Story (1948) – set in Boston, about the Red Sox and Braves
- Little Women (1949) – set in Concord, Massachusetts
- A Connecticut Yankee in King Arthur's Court (1949)

== 1950s ==
- Cheaper by the Dozen (1950)
- Mystery Street (1950) – Massachusetts
- The Underworld Story (1950)
- All About Eve (1950)
- Death of a Salesman (1951)
- The Story of Will Rogers (1952)
- Plymouth Adventure (1952) – the Pilgrims arrive at Plymouth, Massachusetts
- The Actress (1953) – set in Wollaston, Massachusetts (a neighborhood of the city of Quincy)
- White Christmas (1954) – set in Vermont
- Seven Angry Men (1955)
- All That Heaven Allows (1955)
- Lady and the Tramp (1955)
- The Trouble with Harry (1955)
- Carousel (1956)
- High Society (1956) – Newport, Rhode Island
- Moby Dick (1956)
- Fear Strikes Out (1957) – set in Boston, about the Red Sox
- Johnny Tremain (1957) – set in Boston
- The Last Hurrah (1958) – a mayoral race based on Boston mayor James Michael Curley
- Rally 'Round the Flag, Boys! (1958) – set in Connecticut
- The Devil's Disciple (1959) – Websterbridge, New Hampshire
- A Summer Place (1959) – set in fictional Pine Island, Maine

== 1960s ==
- The Bramble Bush (1960)
- The City of the Dead (1960)
- House of Usher (1960)
- Death of a Salesman (1961)
- The Parent Trap (1961)
- Return to Peyton Place (1961)
- Lolita (1962)
- Long Day's Journey Into Night (1962) – Connecticut
- The Miracle Worker (1962)
- The Cardinal (1963)
- Donovan's Reef (1963)
- The Haunted Palace (1963) – fictional New England town of Arkham
- The Haunting (1963)
- My Six Loves (1963)
- Lilith (1964)
- Never Too Late 1965)
- Death of a Salesman (1966)
- Hawaii (1966)
- The Russians Are Coming, the Russians Are Coming (1966) – Gloucester, Massachusetts
- Tormented (1966)
- Who's Afraid of Virginia Woolf? (1966) – set at Trinity College in Connecticut
- The Shuttered Room (1967)
- Valley of the Dolls (1967) – Anne starts in New England
- The Boston Strangler (1968) – set in Boston
- Charly (1968) – set in Boston
- Death of a Salesman (1968)
- Pretty Poison (1968) – set in western Massachusetts
- Rachel, Rachel (1968) – Boston
- Salesman (1968) – Boston
- The Thomas Crown Affair (1968) – set in Boston
- The Curse of the Living Corpse (1969)
- Silent Night, Lonely Night (1969)

== 1970s ==
- Love Story (1970)
- The Out-of-Towners (1970) – set in Boston
- Carnal Knowledge (1971)
- Let's Scare Jessica to Death (1971)
- The Other (1972)
- Slaughterhouse-Five (1972)
- The Friends of Eddie Coyle (1973) – set in Boston
- The Last Detail (1973) – set in Boston
- The Paper Chase (1973)
- The Scarlet Letter (1973)
- Silent Night, Bloody Night (1974) – set in western Massachusetts
- Jaws (1975) – set in fictional Amity, Massachusetts
- The Stepford Wives (1975)
- The Little Girl Who Lives Down the Lane (1976) – set in fictional Wells Harbor, Maine
- Carrie (1976) – set in fictional Chamberlain, Maine
- Between the Lines (1977) – set in Boston
- Pete's Dragon (1977)
- Coma (1978) – set in Boston
- Jaws 2 (1978) – set in fictional Amity, Massachusetts
- The Brink's Job (1979) – set in Boston

== 1980s ==
- The Children (1980)
- Return of the Secaucus 7 (1980)
- A Small Circle of Friends (1980)
- Dead & Buried (1981)
- The Incubus (1981) – fictional New England town of Galen
- On Golden Pond (1981)
- The Flight of Dragons (1982)
- Superstition (1982)
- The Verdict (1982)
- The World According to Garp (1982)
- The Bostonians (1983)
- The Dead Zone (1983)
- The Devonsville Terror (1983)
- Reuben, Reuben (1983)
- The Hotel New Hampshire (1984) – New Hampshire
- Clue (1985) – set in a New England mansion
- Death of a Salesman (1985)
- Real Genius (1985) – fictional college similar to MIT in Cambridge, Massachusetts
- Re-Animator (1985) – set in fictional Arkham, Massachusetts
- The Sure Thing (1985)
- Highlander (1986) – "the famous duel on Boston Common"
- One Crazy Summer (1986)
- Baby Boom (1987) – set in Vermont
- Flowers in the Attic (1987) – Ipswich MA
- The Devil's Disciple (1987) – Websterbridge, NH
- The Witches of Eastwick (1987) – set in fictional Eastwick, Rhode Island
- Beetlejuice (1988) – set in fictional Winter River, Connecticut
- Funny Farm (1988)
- Mystic Pizza (1988) – set in Mystic, Connecticut
- The Nest (1988)
- Second Sight (1989) – comedy set in Boston, Massachusetts
- Sweet Hearts Dance (1988)
- Witchery (1988)
- Dead Poets Society (1989) – set at a fictional academy in Vermont
- Field of Dreams (1989) – they visit Fenway Park in Boston
- Glory (1989) – the 54th Massachusetts Infantry form and train in Readville, now a suburb of Boston, and march through Boston
- Pet Sematary (1989)
- War of the Roses (1989)
- Warlock (1989)

== 1990s ==
- It (1990)
- Mermaids (1990) – set in the fictional town of Eastport, Massachusetts
- Teenage Mutant Ninja Turtles (1990) – set in New York City and rural New England
- Once Around (1991) – Renata starts at her parents' place in New England
- Other People's Money (1991)
- Run (1991) – set in Boston, Massachusetts
- What About Bob? (1991) – set at Lake Winnipesaukee, New Hampshire
- The Babe (1992) – set in Boston, Massachusetts
- Far and Away (1992)
- HouseSitter (1992)
- Lorenzo's Oil (1992)
- Mr. Baseball (1992) – set at Fenway Park
- Scent of a Woman (1992) – set at a New England boarding school
- School Ties (1992) – set at a fictional elite Massachusetts boarding school
- Ethan Frome (1993)
- The Firm (1993)
- The Good Son (1993)
- Hocus Pocus (1993) – set in Salem, Massachusetts
- Malice (1993) – set in Boston, Massachusetts
- The Man Without a Face (1993)
- Needful Things (1993)
- Where the Rivers Flow North (1993)
- Blown Away (1994) – set in Boston, Massachusetts
- Dumb & Dumber (1994) – their journey begins in Providence, Rhode Island
- Federal Hill (1994) – set in Providence, Rhode Island
- In the Mouth of Madness (1994) – set in the fictional town of Hobbs End, New Hampshire
- The Inkwell (1994)
- The Last Seduction (1994)
- Little Women (1994) – set based on Louisa May Alcott's childhood home in Concord, Massachusetts
- The Next Karate Kid (1994) – set in Brookline, Massachusetts
- Quiz Show (1994) – partly set at Van Doren's parents' house in Connecticut
- The Ref (1994) – set in Connecticut
- The River Wild (1994)
- The Shawshank Redemption (1994) – set in Maine
- With Honors (1994) – set at Harvard in Cambridge, Massachusetts
- Wolf (1994)
- Casper (1995) – set in Friendship, Maine
- Dolores Claiborne (1995)
- Jumanji (1995) – set in the fictional town of Brantford, New Hampshire
- Outbreak (1995) – the monkey's owner lands at Logan Airport, Boston, Massachusetts
- The Scarlet Letter (1995)
- Celtic Pride (1996) – set in Boston, Massachusetts
- The Crucible (1996) – Salem, Massachusetts
- Death of a Salesman (1996)
- Eden (1996)
- Man with a Plan (1996)
- Mrs. Winterbourne (1996)
- The Spitfire Grill (1996)
- Amistad (1997) – State House in Providence
- Good Will Hunting (1997) – set in Boston and Cambridge, Massachusetts
- The Ice Storm (1997) – set in New Canaan, Connecticut
- Lolita (1997)
- The Matchmaker (1997) – Sean follows Marcy to Boston, Massachusetts
- The Myth of Fingerprints (1997)
- Skeletons (1997)
- That Darn Cat (1997)
- Affliction (1998)
- Animals with the Tollkeeper (1998)
- A Civil Action (1998) – set in Woburn, Massachusetts
- Monument Ave. (1998) – set in the Charlestown neighborhood of Boston
- Next Stop Wonderland (1998) – set in Boston, Massachusetts
- One True Thing (1998)
- The Parent Trap (1998)
- Urban Legend (film) (1998) - set in New Hampshire
- Practical Magic (1998)
- Safe Men (1998) – set in Providence, Rhode Island
- The Spanish Prisoner (1998)
- Stranger in the Kingdom (1998)
- There's Something About Mary (1998)
- The Boondock Saints (1999) – set in Boston, Massachusetts
- The Cider House Rules (1999) – set in Maine
- Girl, Interrupted (1999) – set in the Boston suburb of Belmont, Massachusetts
- The Iron Giant (1999)
- Lake Placid (1999) – set in Maine
- Message in a Bottle (1999)
- The Out-of-Towners (1999)
- Outside Providence (1999) – set in Providence, Rhode Island
- A Wake in Providence (1999) – Providence, Rhode Island
- The Love Letter (1999)

== 2000s ==
- Almost Famous (2000) – one of the stops is Boston
- Death of a Salesman (2000)
- Me, Myself and Irene (2000) – set in Rhode Island
- The Perfect Storm (2000) – they sail from Gloucester, Massachusetts
- The Skulls (2000) – Yale University in Connecticut
- State and Main (2000)
- The Weight of Water (2000) – set in New Hampshire
- What Lies Beneath (2000) – set in Vermont
- You Can Count on Me (2000) – early scene where he borrows money set in Worcester, Massachusetts
- Blow (2001) – starts in George Jung's hometown of Weymouth, Massachusetts
- The Blue Diner (2001) – set in Boston
- Harvard Man (2001)
- The Heist (2001) – a robbery at a small Boston airport
- In the Bedroom (2001) – set in mid-coast Maine
- Legally Blonde (2001) – Elle is a student at Harvard
- Riding in Cars with Boys (2001)
- Summer Catch (2001) – Cape Cod, Massachusetts
- Super Troopers (2001)
- Wet Hot American Summer (2001)
- What's the Worst That Could Happen? (2001) – filmed (and presumably set) in Boston and elsewhere in MA
- Cabin Fever (2002)
- Confessions of a Dangerous Mind (2002)
- Men in Black II (2002) – Agent J visits former Agent K in Truro, Massachusetts
- Mister Deeds (2002) – set in New Hampshire
- The Gray Man (2002)
- The Skulls II (2002)
- Alex & Emma (2003) – set in Boston
- Anger Management (2003) – they drive to Boston to visit Buddy's mother
- Behind the Red Door (2003) – set in Boston
- Dreamcatcher (2003)
- Dumb and Dumberer: When Harry Met Lloyd (2003)
- The Human Stain (2003)
- Legally Blonde 2: Red, White & Blonde (2003)
- Mona Lisa Smile (2003) – set at Wellesley College in Wellesley, Massachusetts
- Mystic River (2003) – set in Boston
- The Recruit (2003) – James starts as a bartender in Boston
- The Skulls III (2003)
- X2 (2003) – they visit Iceman's parents' home in Boston
- Irish Eyes (2004)
- Saint Ralph (2004)
- Spartan (2004)
- The Stepford Wives (2004) – set in Connecticut
- Still We Believe: The Boston Red Sox Movie (2004)
- Welcome to Mooseport (2004)
- The Family Stone (2005)
- Fever Pitch (2005)
- Ice Princess (2005) – Harvard in Cambridge, Massachusetts
- War of the Worlds (2005) – Ray tries to flee to Boston to meet his ex-wife
- Live Free or Die (2006)
- The Departed (2006) – set in Boston
- Islander (2006) – set in Vinalhaven, Maine
- The Legend of Lucy Keyes (2006)
- Little Children (2006)
- United 93 (2006)
- Vacationland (2006)
- Black Irish (2007)
- Dan in Real Life (2007) – set in Rhode Island
- Everybody Wants to Be Italian (2007) – set in Boston
- The Game Plan (2007)
- Gone Baby Gone (2007) – set in Boston
- The Great Debaters (2007) – they travel to debate at Harvard, in Cambridge, Massachusetts
- 21 (2008) – MIT and Harvard Square in Cambridge, Massachusetts
- The Forbidden Kingdom (2008) – set in Boston
- My Best Friend's Girl (2008) – set in Boston
- The Women (2008) – Connecticut
- The Boondock Saints II: All Saints Day (2009)
- Knowing (2009) – set in Lexington, Massachusetts
- The Maiden Heist (2009)
- Surrogates (2009)
- Tell-Tale (2009)
- The Vicious Kind (2009) – set in Norfolk, Connecticut
- The Way We Get By (2009)

== 2010s ==
- All Good Things (2010) – set in Vermont and Connecticut
- Conviction (2010) – based in Ayer, Massachusetts
- Edge of Darkness (2010)
- The Fighter (2010) – set in Lowell, Massachusetts
- The Ghost Writer (2010) – set on Cape Cod, Massachusetts
- Grown Ups (2010)
- Knight and Day (2010) – the action passes through June's hometown of Boston
- Leap Year (2010) – starts and ends in Boston
- Shutter Island (2010) – set on an island outside Boston
- The Social Network (2010) – set at Harvard University in Cambridge, Massachusetts
- The Town (2010) – set in Charlestown and Cambridge, Massachusetts
- The Innkeepers (2011) – set at the Yankee Pedlar Inn in Torrington, Connecticut
- Man on the Train (2011) – set somewhere in New England
- Sucker Punch (2011) – set in Brattleboro, Vermont
- Ted (2012) – set in Boston, Massachusetts
- Moonrise Kingdom (2012) – set on the fictional New England island of New Penzance
- The Conjuring (2013) – set in Harrisville, Rhode Island
- The Heat (2013) – set in Boston, Massachusetts
- The Way, Way Back (2013) – set in Wareham, Massachusetts
- The Equalizer (2014) – set in Somerville, Massachusetts
- Backgammon (2015) – set in Maine
- Ted 2 (2015)
- Irrational Man (2015) – set in the small-town New England college campus of Braylin
- In the Heart of the Sea (2015) – set in Nantucket
- The Witch (2015)
- Spotlight (2015)
- Joy (2015)
- Black Mass (2015)
- The Finest Hours (2016) – set in Chatham, Massachusetts on Cape Cod
- Manchester by the Sea (2016) – set in Manchester-by-the-Sea, Massachusetts
- Patriots Day (2016)
- Stronger (2017)
- The Equalizer 2 (2018)
- Proud Mary (2018) – set in Boston
- Godzilla: King of the Monsters (2019) - final showdown set in Boston
- Knives Out (2019) – set in Massachusetts
- The Lighthouse (2019) – set in 1890s New England
- Blow the Man Down (2019) – set in Maine

== 2020s ==
- Ava (2020)
- Summer of Mesa (2020) – set on Cape Cod, Massachusetts
- The Block Island Sound (2020) – set in Rhode Island
- Hubie Halloween (2020)
- CODA (2021 film) (2021) - set in Gloucester, Massachusetts
- Hocus Pocus 2 (2022) – set in Salem, Massachusetts
- The Holdovers (2023) – set in Massachusetts
- The Sudbury Devil (2023) – set in Sudbury, Massachusetts
- Thanksgiving (2023) – set in Plymouth, Massachusetts
