= The Ghost (novel) =

2007 novel by Robert Harris

- First edition (UK)
- Author: Robert Harris
- Language: English
- Genre: Thriller novel
- Publisher: Hutchinson (UK); Simon & Schuster (US)
- Publication date: 26 September 2007
- Publication place: United Kingdom
- Media type: Print (hardback)(First edition)
- Pages: 320 (1st UK)
- ISBN: 0-09-179626-1
- OCLC: 440621345
- LC Class: PR6058.A69147 G48 2007c

The Ghost is a 2007 political thriller by the best-selling English novelist and journalist Robert Harris about a professional ghostwriter hired to write the memoirs of a former British prime minister. In 2010, the novel was adapted into a film, The Ghost Writer, directed by Roman Polanski and starring Ewan McGregor and Pierce Brosnan, for which Polanski and Harris co-wrote the screenplay.

== Plot summary ==
Most of the plot takes place on Martha's Vineyard, Massachusetts, where former British Prime Minister Adam Lang has been holed up in the holiday home of his billionaire American publisher to turn out his memoirs on a deadline. Lang's former aide, Mike McAra, was struggling to ghostwrite Lang's memoirs until he drowned when he apparently fell off the Woods Hole ferry. The fictional narrator of The Ghost, whose name is never given, is hired to replace him. His girlfriend walks out on him over his willingness to take the job: "She felt personally betrayed by him; she used to be a party member", reflecting a wider dissatisfaction over Lang's policies, particularly pertaining to the war on terror. The narrator begins to suspect foul play over McAra's death.

Meanwhile, Lang is accused by his enemies of war crimes. A leaked memorandum has revealed that he secretly approved the capture and the extraordinary rendition of British citizens to Guantanamo Bay to face interrogation and torture, one of whom died. Richard Rycart, Lang's disillusioned and renegade former foreign secretary (loosely based on Robin Cook, although inspired by Michael Heseltine), whose desires to adopt an "ethical" foreign policy and criticism of the hardline Atlanticist views of Lang ensured his sacking. Now at the United Nations, Rycart is in a position to do his former boss serious damage. Lang thus appears in imminent threat of indictment at the International Criminal Court and thus exile in the United States.

The narrator borrows a car previously used by McAra, and following the still-programmed into the satnav, follows his last route to the home of Professor Paul Emmett, who attended Cambridge University with Lang, but Emmett is evasive about any connections. The narrator investigates Emmett and discovers rumours that he is a CIA agent, responsible for foreign recruitment, implying Lang's policies as a result of him being a CIA plant throughout his political career. The narrator discovers Rycart's phone number amongst McAra's things and arranges to meet him in New York. Rycart reveals that he and McAra had concluded Lang was recruited by Emmett into the CIA at Cambridge, and that McAra—before his death—ensured a failsafe would be embedded within the memoir manuscript, "in the beginning".

Confronted by the narrator, Lang claims ignorance of the CIA connection, but is blown up by a British suicide bomber vengeful for Britain's participation in the Iraq War. While recovering, the narrator finishes writing the book. At its launch party, he concludes that Lang's wife Ruth, a Fulbright scholar, was tutored by Emmett. The narrator recalls a remark Lang had made, to the effect of Ruth betraying him, and realizes the opening word of each chapter of McAra's manuscript encode a hidden message: "Langs wife Ruth studying in '76 was recruited as a CIA agent in America by Professor Paul Emmett of Harvard University". He leaves promptly and types the novel as a confession, to be entrusted to his ex-girlfriend and revealed only upon his demise. With Rycart recently being killed in a seemingly staged accident, he ruminates about his own death and why he allowed himself to be embroiled in the job in the first place.

== Reception ==
The character Adam Lang is a thinly disguised version of Tony Blair. The fictional counterpart of Cherie Blair is depicted as a sinister manipulator of her husband. Harris told The Guardian before publication: "The day this appears a writ might come through the door. But I would doubt it, knowing him".

The New York Observer commented that the book's "shock-horror revelation" is "so shocking it simply can't be true, though if it were it would certainly explain pretty much everything about the recent history of Great Britain".

Harris said in a NPR interview that politicians like Lang and Blair, particularly when they have been in office a long time, become divorced from everyday reality, read little and end up with a limited outlook. When it comes to writing their memoirs, that tends to make them need a ghostwriter.

== Film adaptation ==
In November 2007 it was announced that Roman Polanski was to direct the film version of the novel. He and Harris would be writing the script. The cast was at first to consist of Nicolas Cage as the ghost, Pierce Brosnan as Adam Lang, with Tilda Swinton as Ruth Lang and Kim Cattrall as Lang's assistant Amelia Bly. Filming was delayed and a year later it was announced that Ewan McGregor would play the ghost instead of Cage and Olivia Williams would take over the role of Ruth Lang. The film was a French-German-British joint production, with Babelsberg Studios near Berlin having a central role and most scenes, especially those from Martha's Vineyard, were shot in Germany. Harris was quoted as saying: "I want to be sure it's out before Tony Blair's own memoirs are published."

Polanski was arrested by Swiss police in September 2009 on his way to the Zurich Film Festival. Babelsberg Studios initially announced that production was put on hold. However, Polanski continued working on post-production from his house arrest in Switzerland. The film, retitled The Ghost Writer, premiered at the 60th Berlin International Film Festival on 12 February 2010. It won multiple awards.
