= Enigma (novel) =

1995 novel set during World War II

- First UK edition
- Author: Robert Harris
- Language: English
- Genre: Historical fiction
- Set in: World War II
- Publisher: Hutchinson
- Publication date: 4 September 1995
- Publication place: United Kingdom
- Media type: Print (hardback)
- ISBN: 0091779235 (first edition, hardback)
- OCLC: 32626914

Enigma is a 1995 novel by Robert Harris about Tom Jericho, a young mathematician trying to break the Germans' "Enigma" ciphers during World War II. Jericho is stationed in Bletchley Park, the British cryptology central office, and is worked to the point of physical and mental exhaustion. The book, Harris' second after the successful 1992 Fatherland, was adapted to film in 2001.

== Plot ==
In February 1943, Tom Jericho, a gifted cryptanalyst at Bletchley Park, is recuperating in Cambridge from a nervous breakdown brought on by the pressures of work and the breakup of his relationship with Claire Romilly, a cipher clerk. After a few weeks, he is told Bletchley needs him back: it has become locked out of the Naval Enigma. Back at Bletchley, Jericho is still infatuated with Claire and makes his way to her lodgings, only to be told by her flatmate Hester Wallace that she is not home.

Jericho waits for Hester to leave and lets himself in to rifle through Claire's possessions. He discovers that her bedroom floorboards have been recently replaced. Beneath them he finds a sheaf of unsolved cryptograms, which he takes. He goes to leave but notices a male figure arrive at the cottage and flee at the sight of him.

Jericho discusses the Enigma lockout with Jozef "Puck" Pukowski, an Anglo-Polish cryptanalyst who fled Poland after the invasion by Germany and so left his family behind. Jericho realises that the way back into the Naval Enigma can be made through collecting 'contact codes', abbreviated reports made by a U-boat when it discovers a convoy. In the meantime, Claire has gone missing. Jericho's attempt to phone her father, Edward Romilly, is rebuffed. He approaches Hester and the two learn that the cryptograms Jericho found had originated from Smolensk in the German-occupied Soviet Union. Hester discovers that the cryptograms were part of a series sent to German Army High Command but that interception and decryption of the signals at Bletchley were abruptly terminated by a high authority for unknown reasons. Hester and Jericho bluff their way into a signals-receiving station and purloin copies of the full set of undeciphered signals.

Back at Bletchley, Jericho joins the effort at deciphering contact reports and eventually produces a 'menu' for the cryptanalytic 'bombes' to work upon. He slips out and secretly deciphers the stolen cryptograms with the Enigma settings Hester has obtained. From them, he learns that the Germans have discovered thousands of bodies buried in the Katyn Forest. The corpses are those of Polish officers who must have been murdered by Britain's ally, the Soviet Union, after its invasion of eastern Poland in 1939. Another cryptogram, previously mistaken to be gibberish, turns out to be a list of abbreviated Polish names. Jericho continues deciphering until he discovers a familiar name: Pukowski, T. He realises this to be Puck's missing father, and that Claire stole the cryptograms to bring to Puck, her secret lover.

Claire's bloodstained clothing is found near a flooded gravel pit. Jericho calls at Puck's lodgings but discovers that he has escaped and made for the railway station. Jericho follows him there and secretly boards the same train. He confronts Puck, who confesses to Claire's murder before shooting the ticket inspector and jumping from the train. Jericho chases him, but Puck is fatally shot by MI5 agents who had boarded the same train; Jericho is also wounded. Recuperating in hospital, Jericho is told by MI5 officer Wigram that Puck, outraged by British authorities' decision to hush up the Katyn massacre perpetrated by their Soviet allies in which his father was murdered, had been preparing to defect to Germany to bring proof that Bletchley had broken Enigma. Claire's father's absence from her funeral tells Jericho that she is not really dead. In London, he obtains the death certificate of one Claire Romilly, who died in childhood. He confronts her father, Edward Romilly, and learns from him that the woman whom he knew as Claire Romilly was Wigram's agent at Bletchley and was sent under a false identity to find the suspected mole there. 'Claire' agreed with Puck to stage her death, but both had different motives for doing so. Now back with MI5, she is alive, but Jericho knows that he will never see her again. Less troubled by the prospect than he might once have been, he returns to Cambridge and sends a letter inviting Hester to meet him there.

== Characters ==
- Tom Jericho: a brilliant mathematician and cryptanalyst recruited to the Government Code and Cypher School at Bletchley Park. A delicate and sensitive man, he suffers a nervous breakdown from the pressures.
- Claire Romilly: an MI5 officer placed at Bletchley to uncover a mole there. Her real name is unknown; she takes the pseudonym Claire Romilly from a girl who died in childhood. She and Tom have a short-lived relationship.
- Hester Wallace: Claire's flatmate, an intelligent woman who resents the sexism that has confined her to a menial role at Bletchley.
- Jozef "Puck" Pukowski: an Anglo-Polish cryptanalyst who fled Poland when Germany invaded. A handsome man, he has little trouble finding female company at Bletchley, including Claire.
- Mr Wigram: an MI5 officer and Claire's controller. Suspecting the existence of a mole at Bletchley, he places Claire there to root him out.

== Reception ==
The book, though fiction, is criticised by people who were at Bletchley Park as bearing little resemblance to the real wartime Bletchley Park.

Kirkus Reviews compared the novel to Harris's first, Fatherland, and wrote "[d]etective-story elements remain in each but don't overwhelm the character-driven plots", while Publishers Weekly predicted that the book is headed "right on to the bestseller lists." Alan Riding, writing in the New York Times summarised the book's reception with "To judge by reviews in the British press, he has passed the "second-novel" test."

== Edition ==
- 1st UK edition, Hutchinson, 1995. ISBN 0-09-177923-5
- 1st US edition, Random House, 1995. ISBN 0-679-42887-9

== See also ==
- Enigma at the Internet Book List
