= The Ghost Writer (soundtrack) =

The Ghost Writer (Original Motion Picture Soundtrack)

Film score by Alexandre Desplat
- Released: 23 February 2010
- Recorded: 2009–10
- Genre: Film score
- Length: 42:12
- Label: Varèse Sarabande

Alexandre Desplat chronology
The Twilight Saga: New Moon (2009)	The Ghost Writer (2010)	The Special Relationship (2010)

The Ghost Writer (Original Motion Picture Soundtrack) is the score album to the 2010 film of the same name directed by Roman Polanski. Featuring musical score composed by Alexandre Desplat, it was released through Varèse Sarabande on 23 February 2010. The film marked the maiden collaboration between Polanski and Desplat, who would later collaborate on forthcoming films thereafter.

== Critical reception ==
Thom Jurek of AllMusic assigned two-and-a-half out of five and wrote "As film music, this works wonderfully; as listening fare, it's a tad monotonous because of its predictable dynamics and pacing."

Dana Stevens of Slate wrote "[Desplat's] music for The Ghost Writer, full of Bernard Herrmann-esque arpeggios and tinkling bells, is at once witty and genuinely suspenseful." Kirk Honeycutt of The Hollywood Reporter wrote "Alexandre Desplat's music prowls around underneath the scenes, channeling Bernard Herrmann's music for [Alfred] Hitchcock". Kenneth Turan of Los Angeles Times wrote "Alexandre Desplat's driving score reminds us from its opening moments of the dynamic compositions of Hitchcock composer of choice Bernard Herrmann".

Ed Gonzalez of Slant Magazine wrote "The score, by the great Alexandre Desplat, is racked with as much tension as Polanski's prismatically askew images, notable for their remarkably absorbing depth of field." Fionnuala Halligan of Screen Daily wrote "Desplat's score is a delicious through line". Mick LaSalle of SFGate wrote "Alexandre Desplat's cheerful musical score, which sounds like something for a 1960s romantic comedy, is in sync with Polanski's vision. It keeps pulling us back, too, inviting us to watch from a critical distance."

== Track listing ==
The Ghost Writer (Original Motion Picture Soundtrack) track listing
No.	Title	Length
1.	"The Ghost Writer"	1:41
2.	"Rhinehart Publishing"	0:58
3.	"Travel to the Island"	2:28
4.	"Lang's Memoirs"	1:43
5.	"Chase on the Ferry"	2:31
6.	"Suspicion"	2:49
7.	"Investigation"	2:07
8.	"Hidden Documents"	2:09
9.	"The Old Man"	1:17
10.	"In the Woods"	3:40
11.	"Prints"	1:45
12.	"The Predecessor"	2:28
13.	"Pr Paul Emmett"	5:39
14.	"Bicycle Ride"	1:52
15.	"Lang and the CIA"	2:21
16.	"The Truth About Ruth"	4:55
17.	"The Ghost Writer" (Reprise)	1:49
Total length:		42:12

== Accolades ==
Accolades for The Ghost Writer (Original Motion Picture Soundtrack)
Award	Date of ceremony	Category	Recipients	Result
César Awards	25 February 2011	Best Music Written for a Film	Alexandre Desplat	Won
European Film Awards	4 December 2010	Best Composer	Alexandre Desplat	Won
Los Angeles Film Critics Association	12 December 2010	Best Music	Alexandre Desplat	Won
World Soundtrack Academy	23 October 2010	Soundtrack Composer of the Year	Alexandre Desplat	Won
