= Archangel (2005 film) =

2005 television film by Jon Jones

- DVD cover
- Written by: Robert Harris; Ian La Frenais; Dick Clement
- Directed by: Jon Jones
- Starring: Daniel Craig; Yekaterina Rednikova
- Music by: Robert Lane
- Country of origin: United Kingdom
- Original languages: Russian; English

Production
- Producer: Christopher Hall
- Cinematography: Chris Seager
- Running time: 124 minutes

Original release
- Network: BBC
- Release: 19 March 2005

Archangel is a television adaptation of the 1998 novel of the same name by Robert Harris. It is so named because much of the story is based in the city of Archangel (locally known as Arkhangelsk), a city in northwestern Russia, located on the Northern Dvina River near its mouth on the White Sea. Made by the BBC in 2005, it was filmed in the city of Riga, Latvia. The timing of the adaptation aligned Harris's fictional narrative with renewed global interest in post-Soviet power dynamics.

== Plot ==
=== Part 1 ===
Dr. Christopher 'Fluke' Kelso, a British professor of Soviet history, attends a conference in Moscow where his lecture is interrupted by protestors from 'Aurora', a faction of Communist hardliners. He is approached by elderly Papu Rapava, who explains that as a young soldier in 1953, he escorted Lavrentiy Beria to Joseph Stalin's deathbed at his Kuntsevo Dacha. Rapava witnessed Beria steal a key from the dying Stalin, using it to retrieve a notebook from Stalin's private safe. Beria had Rapava bury the notebook inside a toolbox in Beria's yard.

Kelso is determined to find the notebook, and a librarian directs him to Beria's old address. He questions powerful politician Vladimir Mamantov, Aurora's leader and a former KGB agent; this brings Kelso to the attention of FSB Major Suvorin, who has him followed. Sneaking into Beria's derelict mansion, Kelso discovers that the toolbox has already been dug up. Aware he is being tailed, Kelso slips away from Suvorin's plainclothes officer at the Hotel Ukraina, and finds Rapava's estranged daughter Zinaida at the club where she works. She reluctantly drives him to her father's apartment, where he finds Rapava murdered in the bathtub.

While calling the police, Kelso is mugged and then detained at the police station, but Suvorin has him released. Already investigating Mamantov for corruption, Suvorin suggests that Kelso's interest in the notebook led Mamantov to have Rapava killed. As Kelso prepares to be deported, American TV reporter R.J. O'Brian takes an interest in his search for the notebook. Zinaida finds Kelso, having received a note from her father. After Kelso reveals to Zinaida of her father's death, they go to see his body and Kelso explains that Mamantov may be responsible.

=== Part 2 ===
Zinaida brings Kelso to her father's garage, where he finds a Makarov pistol and the missing toolbox. They are interrupted by O'Brian, who is eager to cover their discovery. Inside the toolbox, the notebook is revealed to be the journal of Anna, a young woman from Archangel selected to work for high-ranking officials in Moscow under Stalin. At O'Brian's office, Zinaida translates the journal: Anna cared for Stalin, observing his cruelty when he forced officials to dance for him, and he brought her to his room to dance herself when she was menstruating. Though the journal's last pages have been torn out, an NKVD report on Anna's medical history leads Kelso to conclude that she may have mothered an heir of Stalin.

Stealing O'Brian's car, Zinaida and Kelso return to her apartment, where she subdues one of Mamantov's henchmen and recovers her stash of money before they drive to Archangel. Aware of where they are headed, Mamantov is confronted by Suvorin about Rapava's murder. O'Brian airs a report linking the murder to the notebook, and his colleague Louise charters him a plane to Archangel. Bribing their way past a roadblock, Zinaida and Kelso reach Archangel and visit the local Communist Party records office. They learn that Anna's mother still lives in town, and flee from a pair of policemen, who are shot dead by Mamantov's henchman. O'Brian arrives, demanding to join their search.

The three learn from Anna's mother that Anna returned home pregnant, and died two days after giving birth to a son, who was adopted by a couple living in the forest. Suvorin questions Louise, learning about the search for Anna, and his superior orders him to recover the notebook. Kelso becomes suspicious of O'Brian's mysterious sources, and Zinaida realizes that both Anna and Anna's father were killed to protect the secret of her son's birth.

=== Part 3 ===
Kelso and O'Brian investigate the forest, but their car is caught in an anti-tank trench. They encounter Josef, who announces himself as the man they are looking for: the son of Anna and Stalin. Zinaida hides her money and her father's pistol as she is arrested for the policemen's murder, but Suvorin comes to her aid. At his remote cabin, Josef presents Kelso and O'Brian with a suitcase of Stalin's belongings, and the passports and bloody written "confessions" from previous visitors he believed to be spies. Kelso and O'Brian fear they will meet the same fate, as a menacing Josef forces them to dance for him.

Awaking to find Josef gone, Kelso takes O'Brian to retrieve his satellite phone, and tries to stop him from broadcasting his footage of Josef. Suvorin reluctantly accompanies a Spetsnaz squad led by Major Kretov to the cabin, realizing too late that their orders are to kill everyone there. As they prepare to execute Kelso and O'Brian, Suvorin holds Kretov at gunpoint, and the soldiers come under fire from Josef. Kretov shoots Suvorin in the back, and O'Brian is wounded by a bear trap and killed by Kretov, who is shot by Josef. Allowing Kelso to escape, Josef shaves and dresses in Stalin's clothes, bearing a striking resemblance to his father, as a helicopter arrives for him.

Retrieving Zinaida's money and pistol from Anna's mother, Kelso pays for Zinaida's release. Fleeing by train, they learn that O'Brian's broadcast has revealed Josef's existence to the world. Kelso realizes that he was manipulated into confirming Josef as Stalin's heir, and is confronted by Mamantov. Having orchestrated Kelso's "discovery" of the notebook—from arranging the Moscow conference to buying Beria's house to tipping off O'Brian—Mamantov admits that Rapava's theft of the notebook and the military's interference were an unexpected "glitch" in his plan. They are joined by Josef, Mamantov's ultimate tool to seize power and usher in a new era of Stalinism.

Arriving at Vologda, Mamantov introduces Josef to a cheering crowd, while Kelso finds Louise and her cameraman, convincing them to film him as he explains the truth about Mamantov's scheme. He is interrupted and beaten by Mamantov's men, until Zinaida draws the Makarov and shoots Josef dead, avenging her father.

== Cast ==
DVD credits order

- Daniel Craig as Professor Christopher Kelso
- Yekaterina Rednikova as Zinaida Rapava
- Gabriel Macht as R.J. O'Brian
- Konstantin Lavronenko as Josef
- Lev Prygunov as Vladimir Mamantov
- Alexey Diakov as Suvorin
- Ludmila Golubeva as Vavara
- Igor Filipov as Major Kretov
- Claudia Harrison as Louise
- Valery Chernyak as Old Papu
- Igor Chernawsky as Yakov
- Leonīds Lencs as Militia Captain
- Āris Rozentāls as Gregor
- Jelena Soldatova as Masha
- Kristina Brize as Young Zinaida
- Anatoly Putnya as Zinaida's brother
- Jonas Tamulevičius as Commando #1
- Stanislav Samuchov as Commando #2
- Leonidas Kotikas as Commando #3
- Andrei Riabokon as Commando #4

== Production ==
When Archangel was first published in 1998, Mel Gibson's Icon Productions optioned the film rights, but it never went into production. For this production, Harris' book was adapted by screenwriters Dick Clement and Ian La Frenais. Although some early scenes were filmed in Moscow, the majority of the film was shot in Riga, Latvia, standing in for Arkhangelsk (Archangel). The production substituted the former Soviet republic for both Moscow and the remote White Sea settings of the original story, capturing the region’s wintry landscape and post-Soviet atmosphere.

The production navigated the practical and political challenges of filming in a post-Soviet environment, with particular sensitivities surrounding Stalin-era figures like the former secret police chief Lavrentiy Beria. Latvia, unlike more established Eastern European film locations, was relatively untested for Western productions. The Latvian film industry had collapsed following the Soviet withdrawal in the early 1990s and was still in recovery at the time of filming. Despite these challenges, Riga’s urban landscape and nearby pine forests offered a visually effective and cost-efficient stand-in for Russian locales.

== Release ==
Archangel was intended to be a feature film, but was instead produced and released by the BBC as three separate television episodes. It has since been released on streaming services as a single feature.

== Reviews ==
The Hollywood Reporter called Archangel "a fascinating and not-so-far-fetched story of Russian political intrigue," praising director Jon Jones for presenting a world that is "cold, drab and gray, creating an aura that is consistently menacing and vaguely dangerous." Urban Cinephile praised the film's subject matter, characterizing it as "a positively gripping work which never lets up the tension and the intrigue, with great performances and touches of wry humour." Brian Gallagher wrote on MovieWeb, "The thriller has something for everyone: The game of Craig, a mysterious story, lively dialogues, some action, and romance."

In a more mixed review, Net TV Watch wrote of the film, "Though there are no real surprises along the way; things move along at a reasonably fast pace with enough Russian scenery (Archangel was filmed in both Russia and Latvia) to help keep your interest. As with many spy novels, the story becomes less believable as it nears the conclusion."

== Author Robert Harris' response to the film ==
Author Robert Harris expressed satisfaction with the adaptation, particularly with Craig’s interpretation of Kelso. Though at that point he had not written any screenplays for his novels, Harris noted the creative loss of control that often comes with film adaptations. He cited past disappointments, such as the adaptation of his novel Fatherland.
