= An Officer and a Spy (novel) =

2013 historical fiction thriller by Robert Harris

- First edition (UK)
- Author: Robert Harris
- Language: English
- Genre: Thriller, historical fiction
- Publisher: Hutchinson (UK); Knopf (US)
- Publication date: 26 Sept 2013
- Publication place: United Kingdom
- Media type: Print (hardback & paperback)
- Pages: 496 pp (first edition, hardback)
- ISBN: 0091944554 (first edition, hardback)
- OCLC: 846889309

An Officer and a Spy is a 2013 historical fiction thriller by the English writer and journalist Robert Harris. It tells the true story of the French officer Georges Picquart from 1896 to 1906, as he struggles to expose the truth about the doctored evidence that sent Alfred Dreyfus to Devil's Island.

== Plot summary ==
Upon being promoted to run the Statistical Section, the top secret headquarters of French military intelligence, Georges Picquart begins to discover that the evidence that was used to convict Alfred Dreyfus of espionage, which resulted in his imprisonment for life on Devil's Island, is flimsy at best. As he investigates further, he discovers that the military and the government doctored much of the evidence. The real spy is still operating. Warned off the investigation by his superiors, Picquart persists, risking his career and his life, to free an innocent man from unjust imprisonment and to expose a spy operating within the military.

== Reception ==
The novel won the Walter Scott Prize (2014), and the American Library in Paris Book Award (2014). Anna Franco praised the book highly in a review for The Objective Standard, writing, “An Officer and a Spy is at once a compelling historical novel and a spy thriller, portraying a few people who take principled actions to save an innocent man.”

== Film ==
Robert Harris was inspired to write the novel by his friend Roman Polanski's longtime interest in the Dreyfus affair. Harris followed up the novel with a script of the same story, titled D, with Polanski announced as director in 2012.

Although set in Paris, the film was initially scheduled to shoot in Warsaw in 2014, for economic reasons. However, production was postponed after Polanski moved to Poland for filming and the U.S. government filed extradition papers. The Polish government eventually rejected them, by which time new French film tax credits had been introduced, allowing the film to shoot on location in Paris. It was budgeted at 60 million euros and was again set to start production in July 2016, however its production was postponed again as Polanski waited on the availability of a star, whose name was not announced.

It was announced in September 2018 that the project had been retitled J'accuse, and would go into production in the fall of 2018, starring Jean Dujardin as Picquart and co-starring Mathieu Amalric and Olivier Gourmet. It is produced by Alain Goldman and distributed by Gaumont. Jean Dujardin announced on November 26, 2018 that filming had begun that day. Dujardin announced on April 28, 2019 that filming had been completed.
