= Vladimir Klimov =

Medal record

Men's canoe sprint

World Championships
Bronze medal – third place	1971 Belgrade	K-4 10000 m

Vladimir Klimov is a Soviet sprint canoer who competed in the early 1970s. He won a bronze medal in the K-4 10000 m event at the 1971 ICF Canoe Sprint World Championships in Belgrade.
