= Mo Asumang =

German film director, television presenter, voice actor and film producer

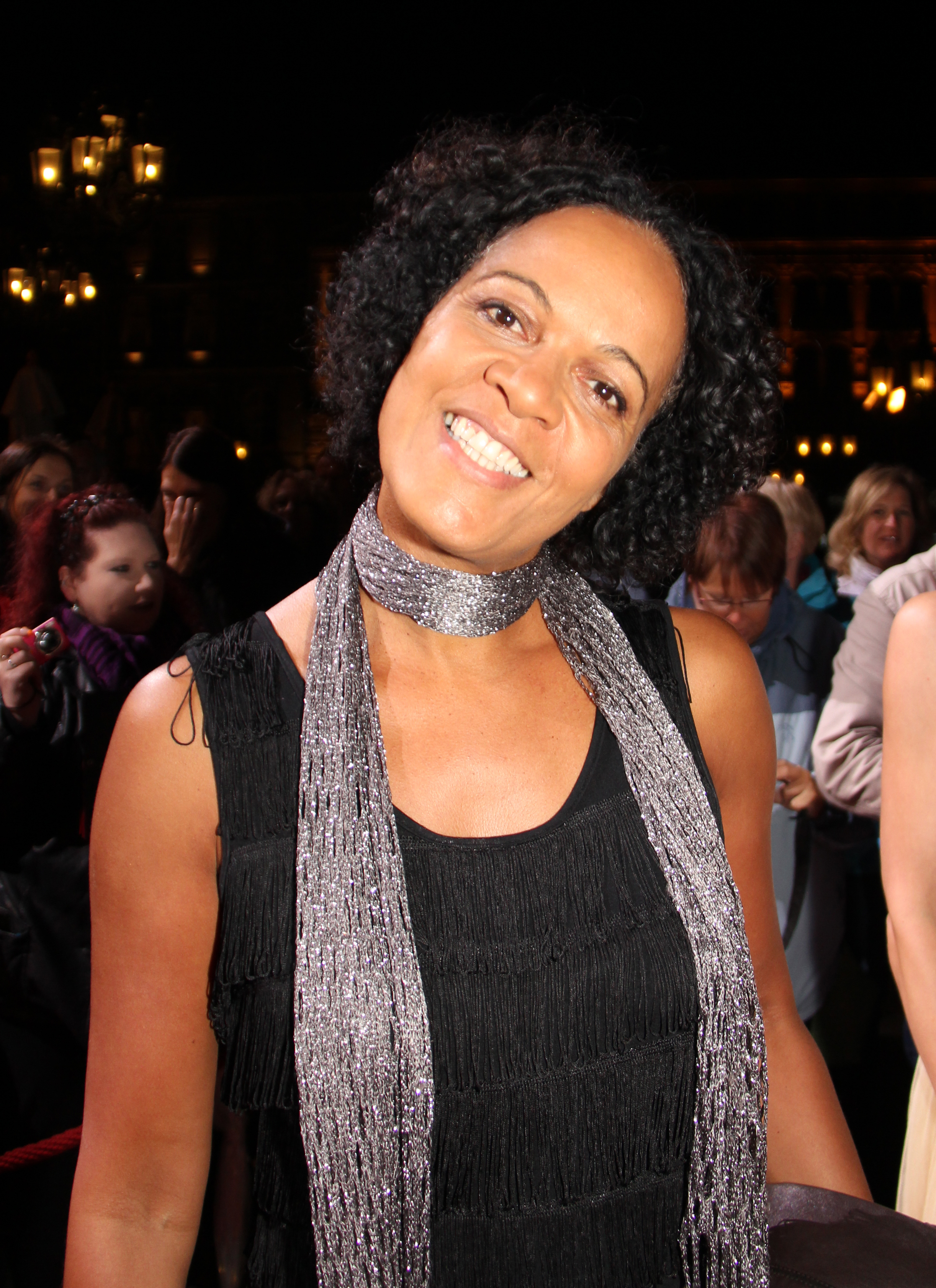
- Mo Asumang in 2012
- Born: Monika Yaa akoma Asumang; 13 June, 1963; Kassel, Germany
- Occupations: Presenter, filmmaker, actress and writer

Monika 'Mo' Yaa akoma Asumang (born 13 June 1963, Kassel) is a German presenter, filmmaker, actress and writer. She created the 2014 documentary The Aryans, in which she confronts racists in both Germany and the US.

== Biography ==
Asumang was born on 13 June 1963 to a Ghanaian father and German mother. She studied Visual Communication at the University of Kassel. Between 1997 and 2000 she presented the television show Liebe Sünde on German TV. She made her directing debut with the documentary Roots Germania, which was nominated for a Grimme-Preis in 2008. Around the Football World Cup 2010, she made a documentary about South Africa called Road to Rainbow - Willkommen in Südafrika.

In 2014, Asumang created the documentary Die Arier (The Aryans). As one of the first black women on German television, she was targeted by racists. To address racism, she confronted racists in Germany, and travelled to the United States, where she had conversations with Ku Klux Klan members. The documentary was also nominated for a Grimme-Preis.

In 2016, Asumang wrote a book about her identity search and experiences meeting racists, Neo-Nazis and Ku-Klux-Klan members face to face, titled Mo und die Arier: Allein unter Rassisten und Neonazis (Mo and the Aryans: Alone among racists and Neo-Nazis).

== See also ==
- Daryl Davis, American activist
