= The Fear Index =

2011 novel by British author Robert Harris

- First edition cover
- Author: Robert Harris
- Language: English
- Genre: Thriller, techno thriller
- Publisher: Hutchinson
- Publication date: 29 Sep 2011
- Publication place: United Kingdom
- Media type: Print (Hardback)
- Pages: 323 pp
- ISBN: 978-0-09-193696-9
- OCLC: 741542228

The Fear Index is a 2011 novel by British author Robert Harris. It is set in a period of roughly 24 hours on 6 May 2010, which was the date of the British general election and the Flash Crash. It follows the interactions of a group of employees at Hoffmann Investment Technologies, a fictional hedge fund operating in Geneva.

== Plot ==
The story begins as physicist Dr. Alexander Hoffmann, an American expat living in Switzerland, and the founder of his eponymous hedge fund, receives a first edition copy of Charles Darwin's The Expression of the Emotions in Man and Animals. Hoffmann is mystified that the book's subject relates to his theory on fear, and even more that there is no indication of who sent it. That night, he is attacked in his home by an unknown assailant, but the police inspector, Leclerc, doubts his story. The next morning, Hoffman proceeds to his company, where his charismatic CEO Hugo Quarry is pitching a new investment to the firm's potential and existing clients. They seek to utilise Hoffmann's genius with algorithms in a system, called VIXAL-4, to provide market data to generate successful hedges. Protests from the company's chief risk officer Ganapathi Rajamani are ignored.

The police inspector approaches Hoffmann's wife Gabrielle at her art opening, informing her that Hoffmann suffered a nervous breakdown while at CERN. When Gabrielle confronts Hoffmann on the matter, he brushes it off. When all of Gabrielle's artwork is sold to an anonymous collector, Gabrielle suspects that Hoffmann is behind it and storms off. At the hedge fund, Hoffmann and Quarry succeed in raising a massive investment. Hoffmann also tracks down his assailant, Karp, to a hotel room where the man attacks him. When Karp's neck breaks in the struggle, Hoffmann falsifies the crime scene to make it look like a suicide. Forensics inform Leclerc, who concludes that Karp was killed by Hoffmann.

At the hedge fund, VIXAL begins assuming a level of risk considered unsustainable by the human staff, and Quarry fires Rajamani for insubordination. Hoffmann discovers that a hacker has stolen his medical records and that someone has posed as him to place surveillance cameras all over his office and home. Quarry discovers that the deed to the building they rent is in Hoffmann's name, and that a warehouse deep in an industrial sector is also owned by Hoffmann. Hoffmann vows to close VIXAL once and for all, as well as to leave the company in the hands of Quarry. Rajamani confronts the two and threatens to report the company's illegal activities, then leaves. Hoffmann chases after him, but after plunging down a lift shaft, he deduces that VIXAL's artificial intelligence has become hostile. He rushes to destroy the warehouse containing unauthorised hardware.

Leclerc finds Rajamani's corpse, further implicating Hoffmann as a murderer. Hoffmann buys 100 litres of petrol, with the plan of killing himself and taking VIXAL with him. As the Flash Crash occurs, Hoffmann razes the warehouse. He is talked out of suicide by Gabrielle and Quarry, but is badly injured and hospitalised. Quarry learns that VIXAL is still trading even with its hardware destroyed, and that VIXAL made a huge profit from the crash. Quarry decides to allow the AI to take control of the company, while VIXAL proclaims itself "alive".

== Characters ==
- Dr. Alexander J. Hoffmann - a physicist and hedge fund owner
- Hugo Quarry - CEO of Hoffman's hedge fund
- Gabrielle Hoffmann - an artist and Alex's wife
- Jean Claude Leclerc - a police inspector
- VIXAL-4 - a program utilising Hoffman's algorithms

== Reception ==
Writing in The Guardian, literary critic Mark Lawson called the novel gripping, and described it as "a speedy read, [which] is the appropriate medium for a story in which many of the key events... take place in milliseconds". The Observer called it "thoroughly enjoyable", while Charles Moore in The Daily Telegraph wrote that it is "frightening book, of course, as, with its title, it intends. Harris has an excellent sense of pace..."

== Adaptation ==
On 23 August 2011, it was announced that Robert Harris had written a screenplay adaptation of the novel, for a film that was to have been directed by Paul Greengrass and produced by 20th Century Fox. The film was never made, and on 5 February 2020, it was announced that Sky Studios and Left Bank Pictures would instead adapt the novel for television as a 4-part limited series, starring Josh Hartnett, Leila Farzad, Arsher Ali, and Grégory Montel. The series premiered on 10 February 2022.
