= Munich (novel) =

Book by Robert Harris

- First edition cover (publ. Hutchinson)
- Author: Robert Harris
- Genre: Historical fiction; Thriller
- Publisher: Hutchinson
- Publication date: 2017
- ISBN: 978-0-091-95919-7

Munich is a 2017 historical novel by English writer Robert Harris. The novel is set in September 1938 over four days in the context of the Munich Agreement. The two main characters, both fictional, are Hugh Legat, private secretary to Neville Chamberlain, and Paul Hartmann, a German junior diplomat and member of an anti-Hitler group. Legat and Hartmann are friends from their student days at Balliol College, Oxford University. The actions of these fictional characters trigger historical events, and Harris leaves us pondering how their actions could have been even more consequential. On 21 September 2017, an article in the Evening Standard asserted that the Paul Hartmann character was based on Adam von Trott zu Solz. Hartmann, like von Trott zu Solz, was executed by hanging as a member of an anti-Nazi conspiracy during World War II. His fictional counterpart Legat dies many years later as an honoured civil servant.

== Film adaptation ==
Munich was made into a 2021 German/British drama film for Netflix.
