= Robert Harris (novelist) =

English novelist (born 1957)

Robert Harris CBE
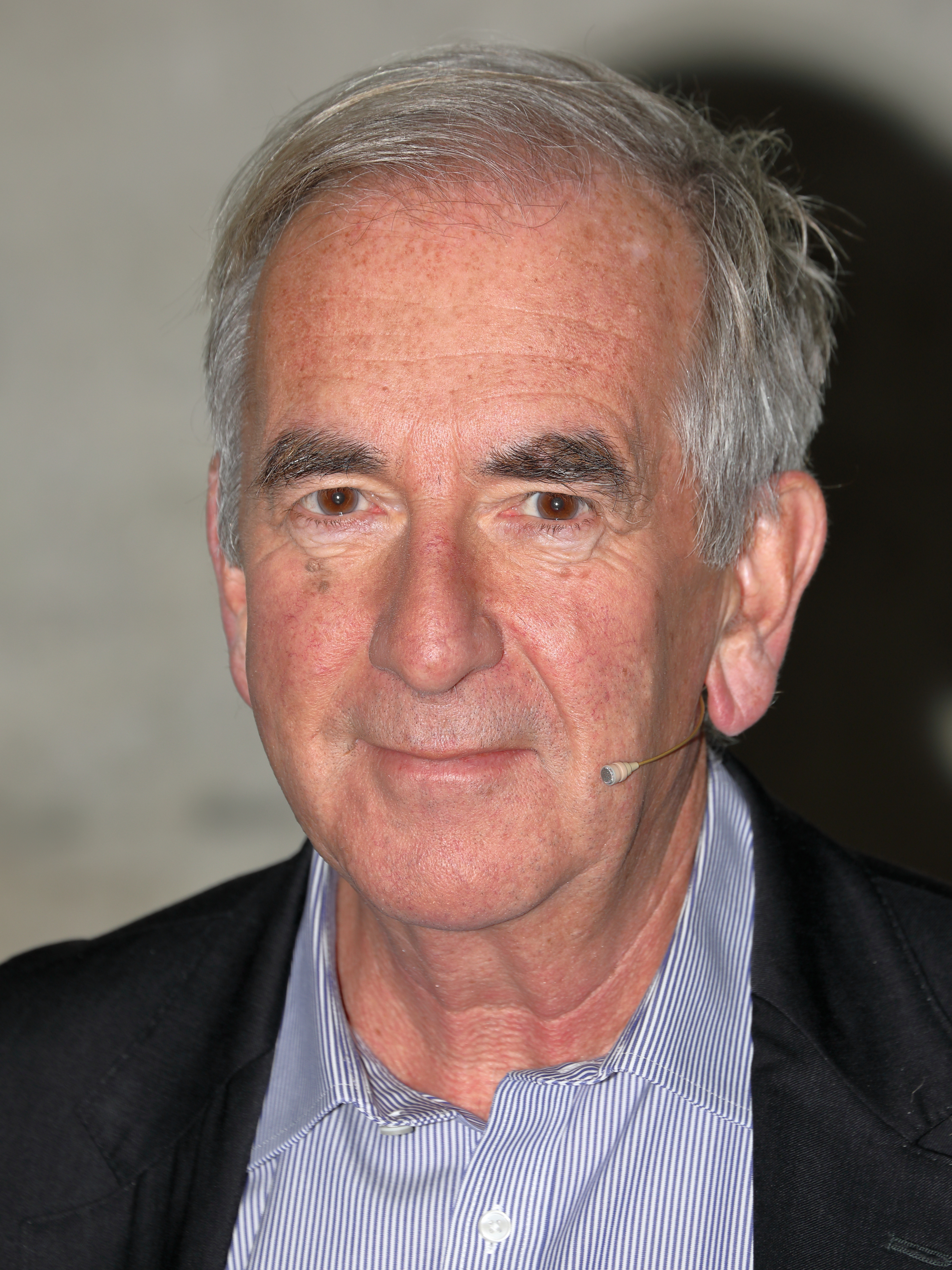
- Harris in 2024
- Born: Robert Dennis Harris; 7 March 1957 (age 69); Nottingham, England
- Education: University of Cambridge (BA)
- Occupation: Novelist
- Spouse: Gill Hornby
- Children: 4
- Relatives: Nick Hornby (brother-in-law)
- Writing career
- Period: 1982–present
- Genre: Fiction
- Subjects: Historical fiction thriller
- Notable works: Fatherland (1992); The Ghost (2007); An Officer and a Spy (2013)
- Notable awards: British Press Award Columnist of the Year (2003); César Award for Best Adaptation (2011, 2020)
- Harris's voice from the BBC programme Desert Island Discs, 28 November 2010

Signature
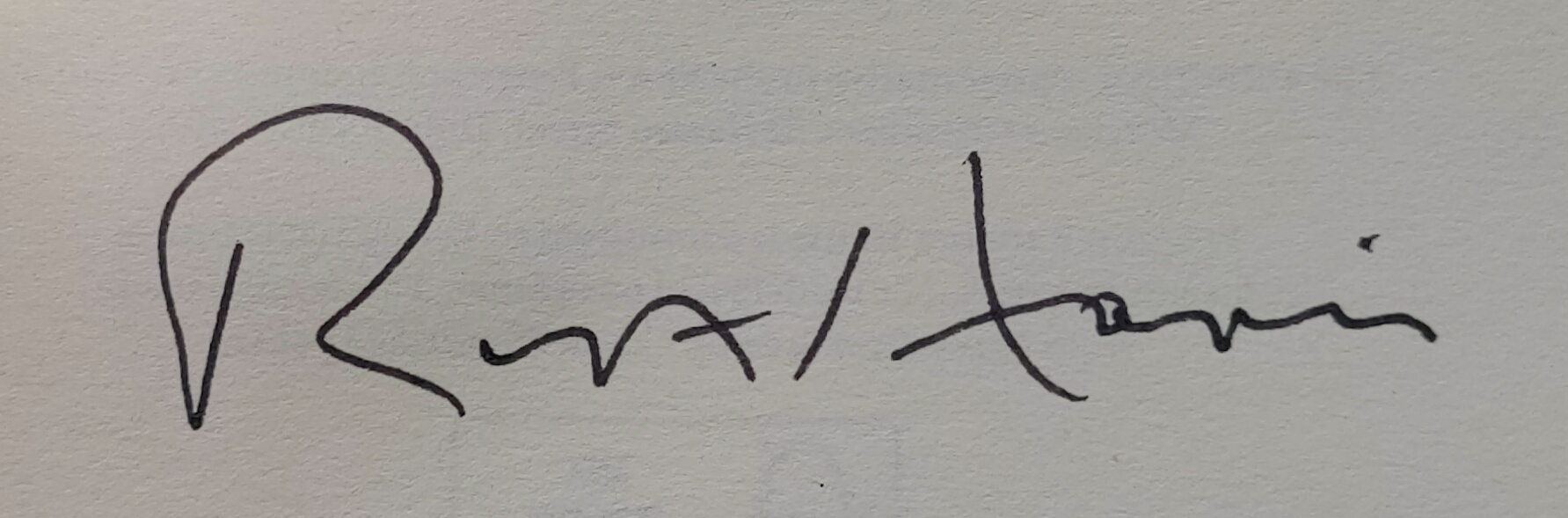

Robert Dennis Harris CBE (born 7 March 1957) is a British novelist and former journalist. Although he began his career in journalism and non-fiction, he is best known for his works of historical fiction. Beginning with the best-seller Fatherland, Harris focused on events surrounding the Second World War, followed by works set in ancient Rome. His later works are varied in settings but are mostly set after 1870.

Several of Harris's novels have been adapted into films, including The Ghost Writer (2010) and An Officer and a Spy (2019), for which he co-wrote the screenplays with director Roman Polanski, and Conclave (2024).

== Early life and education ==
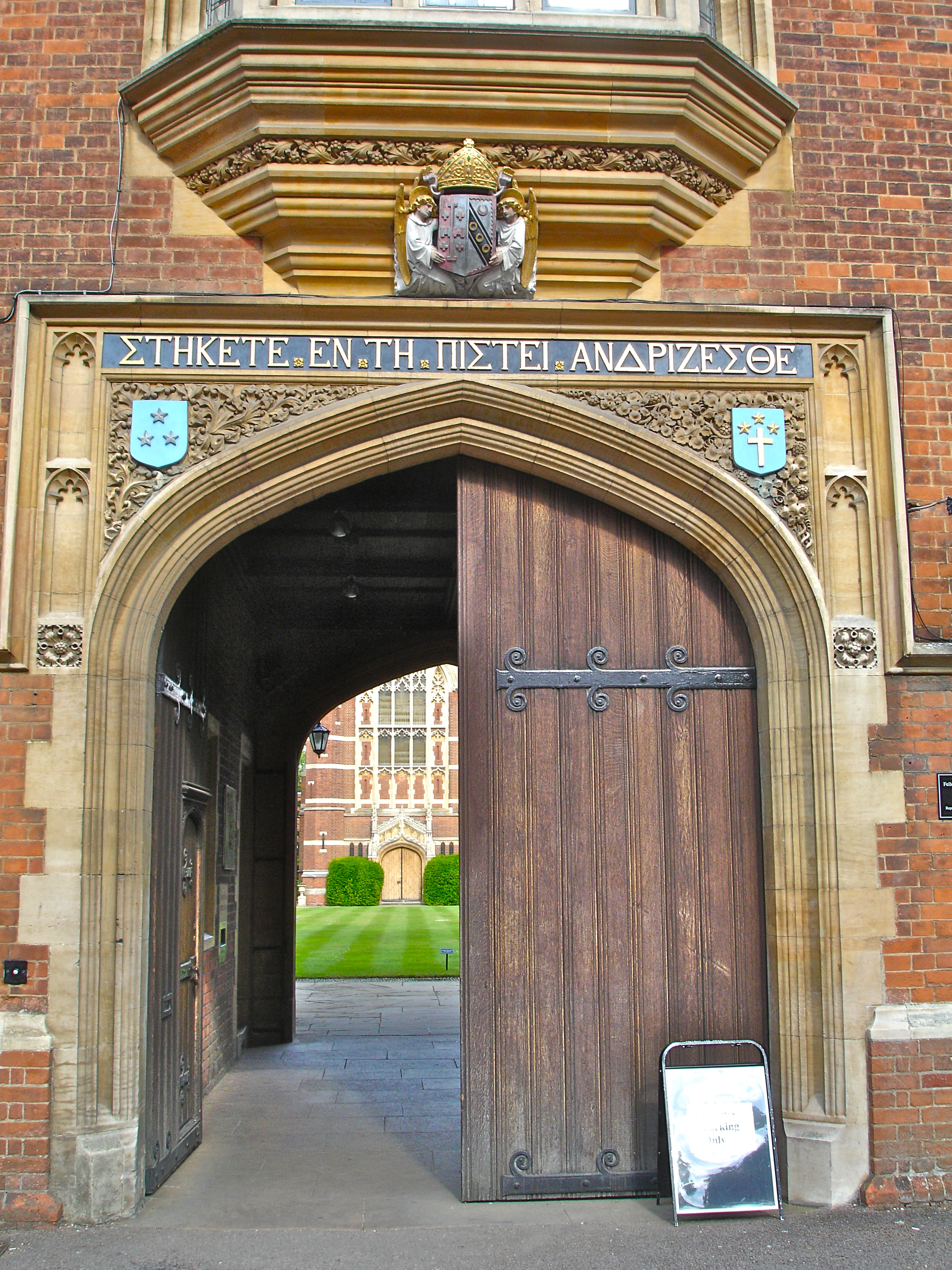
Selwyn College, Cambridge

Robert Harris spent his childhood in a small rented house on a Nottingham council estate. His ambition to become a writer arose at an early age, from visits to the local printing plant where his father worked. Harris went to Belvoir High School in Bottesford, Leicestershire, and then King Edward VII School, Melton Mowbray, where a hall was later named after him. There he wrote plays and edited the school magazine. He lived at 17 Fleming Avenue.

Harris read English literature at Selwyn College, Cambridge, where he was elected president of the Cambridge Union and editor of Varsity, the oldest student newspaper at Cambridge University.

== Career ==
=== Early career ===
After leaving Cambridge, Harris joined the BBC and worked on news and current affairs programmes such as Panorama and Newsnight. In 1987, at the age of 30, he became political editor of The Observer. He later wrote regular columns for The Sunday Times and The Daily Telegraph.

=== Non-fiction (1982–1990) ===
Harris co-wrote his first book, A Higher Form of Killing (1982), with fellow BBC journalist Jeremy Paxman: this was a study of chemical and biological warfare. Other non-fiction works followed: Gotcha! The Government, the Media and the Falklands Crisis (1983) covering the Falklands War; The Making of Neil Kinnock (1984), a profile of Kinnock just after he became leader of the Opposition; Selling Hitler (1986), an investigation of the Hitler Diaries scandal; and Good and Faithful Servant (1990), a study of Bernard Ingham, press secretary to Margaret Thatcher while she was prime minister.

=== Fiction ===
==== Fatherland (1992) ====
Harris's bestselling first novel, the alternative-history Fatherland (1992), has as its setting a world where Nazi Germany won the Second World War. Publication enabled Harris to become a full-time novelist. It was adapted as a television film by HBO in 1994.

Harris has stated that the proceeds from the book enabled him to buy a former vicarage in Berkshire that he jokingly dubbed "the house that Hitler built", where he still lives.

==== Enigma (1995) ====
His second novel, Enigma, portrayed the breaking of the German Enigma cipher during the Second World War at Cambridge University and Bletchley Park. It was adapted as a film by writer Tom Stoppard, starring Dougray Scott and Kate Winslet, in 2001.

==== Archangel (1998) ====
Archangel was another international best seller. It follows a British historian in contemporary Russia as he hunts for a secret notebook, believed to be Stalin's diary. It was adapted as a television film by the BBC, starring Daniel Craig, in 2005.

==== Pompeii (2003) ====
In 2003 Harris turned his attention to ancient Rome with Pompeii. The novel is about a Roman aqueduct engineer, working near the city of Pompeii just before the eruption of Vesuvius in 79 CE. As the aqueducts begin to malfunction, he investigates and realises the volcano is shifting the ground beneath and is near eruption. Meanwhile, he falls in love with the young daughter of a powerful local businessman who was illicitly dealing with his predecessor to divert municipal water for his own uses, and will do anything to keep that deal going.

==== Imperium (2006) ====
In 2006, Harris followed up on Pompeii with another Roman-era work, Imperium, the first novel in a trilogy centred on the life of the great Roman orator and lawyer Marcus Tullius Cicero.

==== The Ghost (2007) ====
Harris was an early and enthusiastic supporter of Tony Blair (a personal acquaintance) and a donor to New Labour, but the war in Iraq blunted his enthusiasm. "We had our ups and downs, but we didn't really fall out until the invasion of Iraq, which made no sense to me," Harris has said.

In 2007, after Blair resigned, Harris dropped his other work to write The Ghost. The title refers both to a professional ghostwriter, whose lengthy memorandum forms the novel, and to his immediate predecessor who, as the action opens, has just drowned in gruesome and mysterious circumstances. The dead man has been ghosting the autobiography of a recently unseated British prime minister called Adam Lang, a thinly veiled version of Blair. The fictional counterpart of Cherie Blair is depicted as a sinister manipulator of her husband. Harris told The Guardian before publication: "The day this appears a writ might come through the door. But I would doubt it, knowing him."

Harris said in a U.S. National Public Radio interview that politicians like Lang and Blair, particularly when they have been in office for a long time, become divorced from everyday reality, read little and end up with a pretty limited overall outlook. When it comes to writing their memoirs, they therefore tend to have all the more need of a ghostwriter.

Harris hinted at a third, far less obvious, allusion hidden in the novel's title, and, more significantly, at a possible motive for having written the book in the first place. Blair, he said, had himself been ghostwriter, in effect, to President Bush when giving public reasons for invading Iraq: he had argued the case better than had the President himself.

The New York Observer, headlining its otherwise hostile review The Blair Snitch Project, commented that the book's "shock-horror revelation" was "so shocking it simply can't be true, though if it were it would certainly explain pretty much everything about the recent history of Great Britain."

Roman Polanski and Harris adapted the novel as the film The Ghost Writer (2010).

==== Lustrum (2009) ====
The second novel in the Cicero trilogy, Lustrum, was published in October 2009. It was released in February 2010 in the US under the alternative title of Conspirata.

==== The Fear Index (2011) ====
The Fear Index was published by Hutchinson in September 2011. It focuses on the 2010 Flash Crash and follows an American expat hedge fund operator living in Geneva who activates a new system of computer algorithms that he names VIXAL-4, which is designed to operate faster than human beings, but which begins to become uncontrollable by its human operators. It was adapted by Sky Atlantic in 2022 as a 4-part limited series starring Josh Hartnett.

==== An Officer and a Spy (2013) ====
An Officer and a Spy is the story of French officer Georges Picquart, a historical character, who is promoted in 1895 to run France's Statistical Section, its secret intelligence division. He gradually realises that Alfred Dreyfus has been unjustly imprisoned for acts of espionage committed by another man who is still free and still spying for the Germans. He risks his career and his life to expose the truth. Harris was inspired to write the novel by his friend Roman Polanski, who adapted it as a film in 2019.

==== Dictator (2015) ====
Dictator was the long-promised conclusion to the Harris Cicero trilogy. It was published by Hutchinson on 8 October 2015.

==== Conclave (2016) ====
Conclave, published in 2016, is a novel "set over 72 hours in the Vatican", leading up to "the election of a fictional Pope". The film adaptation, starring Ralph Fiennes and Stanley Tucci and directed by Edward Berger, was released in the US by Focus Features on 1 November 2024.

==== Munich (2017) ====
Munich, published on 21 September 2017, is a thriller set during the negotiations for the 1938 Munich Agreement between Hitler and UK Prime Minister Neville Chamberlain. The story is told through the eyes of two young civil servants – one German, Hartmann, and one English, Legat, who reunite at the fateful summit, six years after they were friends at university. It was adapted for Netflix as Munich – The Edge of War, starring Jeremy Irons and George MacKay in 2022.

==== The Second Sleep (2019) ====
The Second Sleep is set in the small English village of Addicott St. George in Wessex in the year 1468 (but it is not "our" 1468; it's 800 years later than the 2020s) and follows the events of a priest, Christopher Fairfax, sent there to bury the previous priest, and the secrets he discovers: about the priest, the village, and the society in which they live.

==== V2 (2020) ====
V2 is a thriller set in November 1944 which follows the parallel stories of a German V-2 rocket scientist, Rudi Graf, and a British WAAF, Kay Caton-Walsh.

==== Act of Oblivion (2022) ====
Act of Oblivion is set in 1660 and follows Richard Nayler of the Privy Council who is tasked with tracking down the regicides Edward Whalley and William Goffe. The book is notable for featuring only real figures as named characters, with the sole exception of Nayler.

==== Precipice (2024) ====
Precipice follows a young British intelligence officer on the eve of World War I who is assigned to investigate the disappearance of top-secret documents during Prime Minister H. H. Asquith's affair with Venetia Stanley.

==== Agrippa (2026) ====
Agrippa follows Marcus Vipsanius Agrippa as he writes his memoirs and looks back on his lifelong friendship with Octavian, who became the Roman emperor Augustus.

=== Work with Roman Polanski ===
In 2007, Harris wrote a screenplay of his novel Pompeii for director Roman Polanski. Harris acknowledged in many interviews that the plot of his novel was inspired by Polanski's film Chinatown, and Polanski said it was precisely that similarity that had attracted him to Pompeii. The film, to be produced by Summit Entertainment, was announced at the Cannes Film Festival in 2007 as potentially the most expensive European film ever made, set to be shot in Spain. Media reports suggested Polanski wanted Orlando Bloom and Scarlett Johansson to play the two leads. The film was cancelled in September 2007 as a result of a looming actors' strike.

Polanski and Harris then turned to Harris's bestseller, The Ghost. They co-wrote a script and Polanski announced filming for early 2008, with Nicolas Cage, Pierce Brosnan, Tilda Swinton and Kim Cattrall starring. The film was then postponed by a year, with Ewan McGregor and Olivia Williams replacing Cage and Swinton. The film, titled The Ghost Writer in all territories except the UK, was shot in early 2009 in Berlin and on the island of Sylt in the North Sea, which stood in for London and Martha's Vineyard respectively, owing to Polanski's inability to travel legally to those places. In spite of his later incarceration in Switzerland, he oversaw post-production while under house arrest and the film premiered at the Berlin Film Festival in February 2010.

Harris was inspired to write his novel An Officer and a Spy by Polanski's longtime interest in the Dreyfus affair. He also wrote a screenplay based on the story, which Polanski was to direct in 2012. The screenplay was first titled D, after the initial written on the secret file that secured Dreyfus' conviction. After many years of production difficulties, it was filmed in 2018, starring Jean Dujardin. It was produced by Alain Goldman and released by Gaumont in 2019.

In June 2018 Harris reiterated his support for Polanski, and branded criticisms of Polanski's crimes as being a problem of culture and fashion. "The culture has completely changed....And so the question is: "Do you then say, OK fine, I follow the culture.' Or do I say: 'Well, he hasn't done anything since then. He won the Oscar, he got a standing ovation in Los Angeles.' The zeitgeist has changed. Do you change with it? I don't know, to be honest with you. Morally, I don't see why I should change my position because the fashion has changed."

=== TV appearances and radio broadcasts ===
Harris has appeared on the BBC satirical panel game Have I Got News for You in episode three of the first series in 1990, and in episode four of the second series a year later. In the first he appeared as a last-minute replacement for the politician Roy Hattersley. In 1991 he played a supporting role as a reporter in the television series Selling Hitler, which was based on his non-fiction book of the same name. On 12 October 2007, he made a third appearance on the programme, 17 years, to the day, after his first appearance. Since the gap between his second and third appearance was nearly 16 years, Harris enjoyed the distinction of the longest gap between two successive appearances in the show's history until Eddie Izzard appeared on 22 April 2016, just under 20 years after his last appearance on Episode 5 of Series 11 (17 May 1996).

On 2 December 2010, Harris appeared on the radio programme Desert Island Discs, when he spoke about his childhood and his friendships with Tony Blair and Roman Polanski.

Harris appeared on the American PBS show Charlie Rose (2012). Harris discussed his novel The Fear Index which he likened to a modern-day Gothic novel along the lines of Mary Shelley's Frankenstein. Harris also discussed the adaptation of his novel, The Ghost that came out as the movie, The Ghost Writer directed by Roman Polanski.

=== Columnist ===
Harris was a columnist for The Sunday Times, but gave it up in 1997. He returned to journalism in 2001, writing for The Daily Telegraph. He was named "Columnist of the Year" at the 2003 British Press Awards.

== Personal life ==
Harris lives in a former vicarage in Kintbury, near Hungerford in Berkshire, with his wife, Gill Hornby, herself a writer and sister of best-selling novelist Nick Hornby. They have four children. Harris is good friends with Peter Mandelson, who is godfather to one of his children.

Harris contributed a short story, "PMQ", to Hornby's 2000 collection Speaking with the Angel.

Formerly a donor to the Labour Party, he renounced his support for the party after the appointment of Guardian journalist Seumas Milne as its communications director by leader Jeremy Corbyn. He now supports the Liberal Democrats.

Harris considers Graham Greene, George Orwell and Evelyn Waugh his "literary heroes". Some of his favourite books include Journey to the Abyss: The Diaries of Count Harry Kessler 1880-1918, a series of diary entries from Harry von Kessler, edited by Laird M. Easton, and Great Expectations, a novel by Charles Dickens that he describes as a "supreme example" of how plot, characters, and language can all work in tandem.

== Works ==
=== Fiction ===
==== Stand-alone works ====
- Fatherland (1992)
- Enigma (1995)
- Archangel (1998)
- Pompeii (2003)
- The Ghost (2007)
- The Fear Index (2011)
- An Officer and a Spy (2013)
- Conclave (2016)
- Munich (2017)
- The Second Sleep (2019)
- V2 (2020)
- Act of Oblivion (2022)
- Precipice (2024)
- Agrippa (2026)

==== The Cicero Trilogy ====
- Imperium (2006)
- Lustrum (Note: Retitled Conspirata for release in US and Italy) (2009)
- Dictator (2015)

==== Short fiction ====
- "PMQ" (in the Nick Hornby-edited anthology Speaking with the Angel)

==== Screenplays ====
- The Ghost Writer (2010) (with Roman Polanski)
- An Officer and a Spy (2019) (with Roman Polanski)

=== Non-fiction ===
- A Higher Form of Killing: The Secret Story of Gas and Germ Warfare (with Jeremy Paxman). London: Chatto & Windus, March 1982 ISBN 978-0-7011-2585-1
- Gotcha! The Government, the Media and the Falklands Crisis. London: Faber and Faber, January 1983 ISBN 978-0-571-13052-8
- The Making of Neil Kinnock. London: Faber and Faber, 17 September 1984 ISBN 978-0-571-13267-6
- Selling Hitler: The Story of the Hitler Diaries. London: Faber and Faber, 17 February 1986 ISBN 978-0-571-13557-8
- Good and Faithful Servant: The Unauthorized Biography of Bernard Ingham. London: Faber and Faber, December 1990 ISBN 978-0-571-16108-9

== Awards and nominations ==
Year	Award	Category	Work	Result	Ref.
2011	César Awards	Best Adaptation	The Ghost Writer	Won	
2020	César Awards	Best Adaptation	An Officer and a Spy	Won	
2010	European Film Awards	Best Screenwriter	The Ghost Writer	Won	
2019	European Film Awards	Best Screenwriter	An Officer and a Spy	Nominated	
2011	Lumière Awards	Best Screenplay	The Ghost Writer	Won	
2020	Lumière Awards	Best Screenplay	An Officer and a Spy	Nominated	
2010	Walter Scott Prize		Lustrum	Shortlisted	
2014	Walter Scott Prize		An Officer and a Spy	Won	
2023	Walter Scott Prize		Act of Oblivion	Shortlisted	
2025	USC Scripter Awards	Film	Conclave	Won	

== Honours ==
- He was elected a Fellow of the Royal Society of Literature in 1996.
- He was awarded the Honorary degree of Doctor of Letters (D.Litt) by the University of Leicester on 22 July 2022.
- He was appointed Commander of the Order of the British Empire (CBE) in the 2025 New Year Honours List for services to Literature.
