= Yekaterina Rednikova =

Russian theatre and film actress (born 1973)

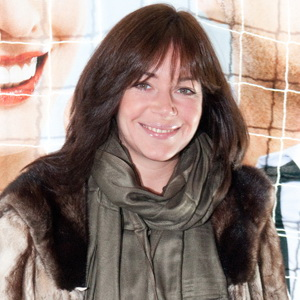
- Yekaterina Rednikova, 2011
- Born: Yekaterina Valerevna Rednikova; May 17, 1973 (age 53); Moscow, RSFSR, USSR
- Occupation: Actress
- Years active: 1990–present
- Spouse: Sergei Konov (m. 2008)
- Children: 1

Yekaterina Valerevna Rednikova (also Ekaterina Rednikova: Russian: Екатерина Валерьевна Редникова, born May 17, 1973) is a Russian theatre and film actress, best known for her roles in films including The Thief and The Man of No Return.

== Selected filmography ==
- Babnik (1990)
- The Thief (1997)
- Balalayka (2002)
- Archangel (2005)
- Bolshoe zlo i melkie pakosti (2005)
- Posledniy bronepoezd (2006)
- The Man of No Return (2006)
- Sovereign (2007)
- He Who Puts Out the Light (2008)
- The Gift to Stalin (2008)
- Home (2011)
- La ligne de feu (2020)

== Award ==
=== Nika Award ===
- 1998 - Best Actress: The Thief (Katya)
