= Gaster =

Gaster may refer to:

== People and fictional characters ==
- Gaster (surname)
- Gaster Nsereko (born 1965), Ugandan Anglican bishop
- W.D. Gaster, a character from the video game Undertale
- Sir Gaster, a character in the book Le Quart Livre by François Rabelais
- Gaster, a character in the television series PaRappa the Rapper

== Other uses ==
- Gaster (insect anatomy), an insect body part
- a trade name of famotidine, an inhibitor of stomach acid production
- Gaster District, a former district in St. Gallen, Switzerland that later became the See-Gaster constituency
