= St Paul's Cathedral, Kako =

Cathedral in Uganda

St Paul Cathedral Kako
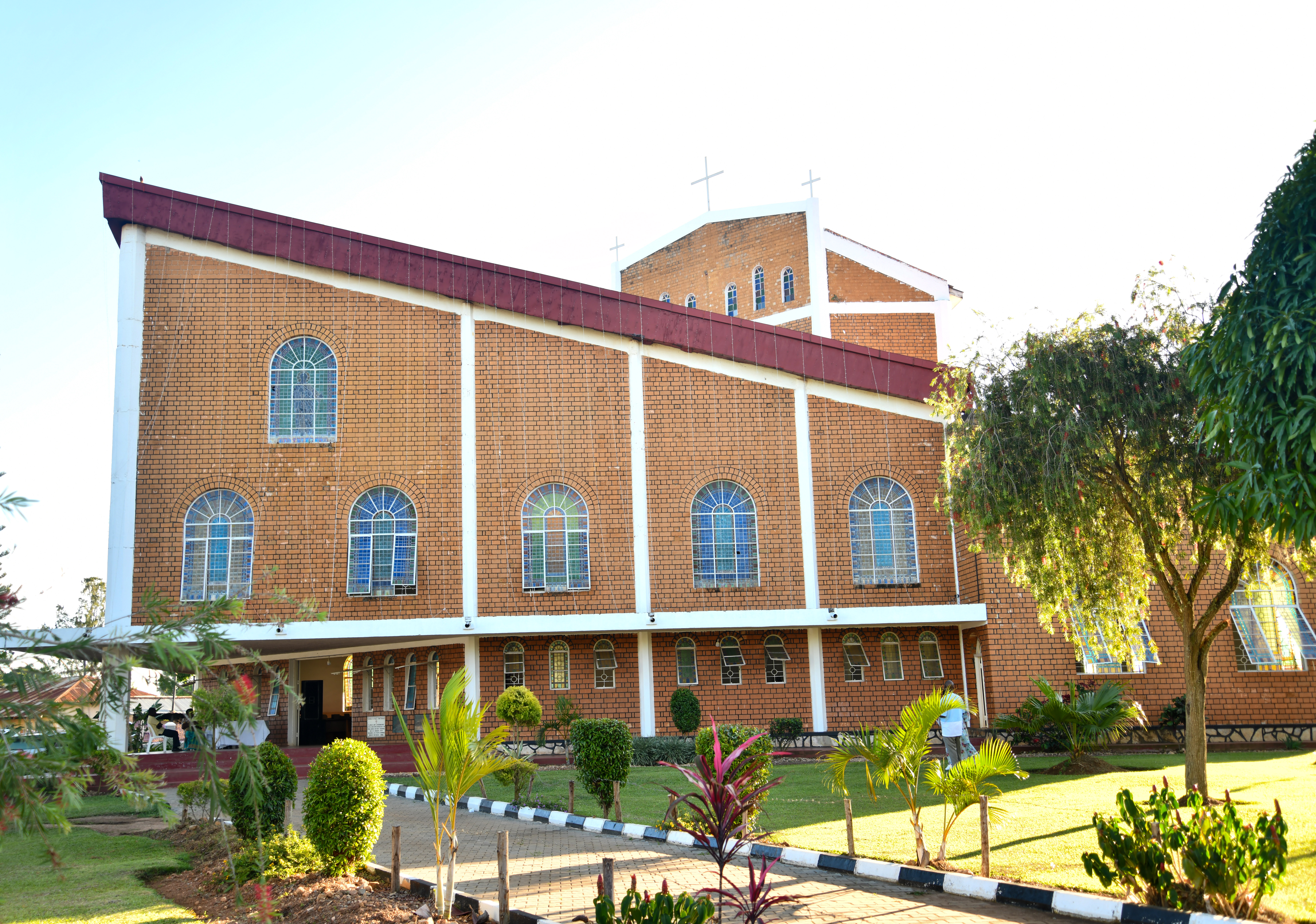
- St Paul Cathedral Kako

Religion
- Affiliation: Anglican Communion
- District: Kampala, Uganda
- Ecclesiastical or organizational status: Major cathedral

Location
- Location: Kako, Masaka, Uganda
- Interactive map of St Paul Cathedral Kako
- Coordinates: 0°16′46″S 31°48′17″E

St Paul's Cathedral, Kako is a cathedral of the Church of Uganda (Anglican ) in Masaka, Central Region of Uganda. It is the seat of the Diocese of West Buganda, which was erected in 1960.

== Location ==
The cathedral is located on Kako Hill, approximately 10 kilometres (6.2 mi) by northeast of Masaka City the regional business capital. The coordinates of St Paul's Cathedral Kako are: 0°16'45.5"S, 31°48'16.6"E (Latitude: -0.279317; Longitude: 31.804624).

== History ==
Prior to 1960, the Anglican churches in the Masaka region were administered as part of the vast Namirembe Diocese. During this period, Kako served as a prominent mission station and a center for evangelism and education in the region.

In 1960, the Diocese of West Buganda was inaugurated, carved out of the Namirembe Diocese to better serve the growing congregation in western Buganda. Upon this inauguration, St Paul's Church at Kako was elevated to the status of a cathedral and became the diocesan headquarters.

The first bishop to be seated at the cathedral was the Rt. Rev. Festo Lutaya (1960–1965). Over the decades, the cathedral has hosted numerous high-profile ecclesiastical events, including the consecration and enthronement of successive bishops.

== List of Bishops ==
The following bishops have served the Diocese of West Buganda with St Paul's Kako as their seat:

- 1960–1965: Festo Lutaya (First Bishop)
- 1965–1985: Stephen Tomusange
- 1985–2001: Christopher Senyonjo
- 2001–2011: Samuel Keefa Kamya
- 2011–2015: Godfrey Makumbi (Died in office)
- 2016–2024: Henry Katumba Tamale
- 2025–Present: Gaster Nsereko

== Notable events ==
In 2025, the cathedral hosted the consecration service of the Rt. Rev. Gaster Nsereko as the 7th Bishop of West Buganda, succeeding Bishop Henry Katumba Tamale.

== See also ==
Namirembe Cathedral

Church of Uganda

Masaka District
