= Caster (disambiguation) =

A caster is a type of wheel.

Caster may also refer to:

== Industry ==
- Caster angle, one of the angles important to automotive suspension
- Caster, a machine used in metal casting

== Products ==
- A small condiment bottle or cruet
- A type of sugar
- Caster (cigarette)

== Fishing ==
- Caster (maggot), a fly pupa used as bait.

== People ==
- Caster Semenya, South African runner
- Andrew Caster, American ophthalmologist
- George Caster (1907–1955), American baseball player
- Jake Caster, American wake surfer
- Kenneth Edward Caster (1908–1992), American geologist and paleontologist
- Max Caster (born 1989), American wrestler and rapper
- Nadine Caster (born 1965), French athlete from Martinique
- Reylynn Caster (born 2003/2004), American actress
- Rich Caster (1948–2024), American footballer
- Samuel Caster, American businessman
- Sylvie Caster (born 1952), French journalist and writer
- Yurendell DeCaster, Dutch-Curaçaoan baseball player

== Fiction ==
- Caster (Fate/stay night), an anime character
- Wizard (character class), a character class who casts spells
- Will Caster and his wife Evelyn Caster, the two main protagonists in the movie Transcendence

== See also ==
- Casting (disambiguation)
- Castor (disambiguation)
- Gaster (surname)
- Kaster, village in West Flanders, Belgium
