= WD =

WD may refer to:

== Arts and entertainment ==
- The Walking Dead (TV series)
- Watership Down
- White Dwarf (magazine)
- W.D. Gaster, a character in Undertale and Deltarune

== Businesses and organizations ==
=== Government agencies ===
- Royal Canadian Air Force Women's Division
- War Department (United Kingdom)

=== Other businesses and organizations ===
- DAS Air Cargo (IATA code WD)
- Wardair (defunct IATA code WD)
- WD-40 Company, manufacturer of household and multi-use products, well known for its signature brand, WD-40.
- Western Digital, a computer storage manufacturer
- Western Economic Diversification Canada, a Canadian government agency
- Wikidata, a Wikimedia Foundation collaborative online project
- Wilts & Dorset, a southern England bus operator
- Winn-Dixie, an American supermarket chain

== Places ==
- WD postcode area, England, UK
- County Waterford, Ireland

== Science and technology ==
- WD-40, a penetrating oil spray
- Band 3, a protein
- Web Dynpro, a web application for developing business applications
- Whipple's disease, a rare, systemic infectious disease caused by the bacterium Tropheryma whipplei
- White dwarf, a compact star in astronomy
- Working directory, in computing
- Western Digital, a storage brand

== Other uses ==
- Walt Disney, American cartoonist and businessman
- Wedding Day
- Weekday
- "Well done," in Internet slang
- Withdrawal (disambiguation)
- Wing defence, position in netball
- Working Draft, a stage in the standardization process of the International Organization for Standardization

== See also ==
- Watchdog (disambiguation)
