= CAST =

CAST may refer to:

== Medicine ==
- Cardiac Arrhythmia Suppression Trial, a heart study in the 1980s
- Childhood Autism Spectrum Test, formerly the Childhood Asperger Syndrome Test
- Chronic addiction substitution treatment, a policy adopted in Vancouver Canada to reduce the harms of drug prohibition

== Organizations ==
- CAST (company), a software intelligence company
- Canadian Air-Sea Transportable Brigade Group, a former organization in the Canadian military
- Carolina Actors Studio Theatre, a theater company in Charlotte, North Carolina
- Centre for Analysis of Strategies and Technologies, a Russian non-governmental organization which conducts research on arms trade and defense trends
- Certification Authorities Software Team, avionic certification harmonization
- China Academy of Space Technology
- China Association for Science and Technology
- Coalition to Abolish Slavery and Trafficking, a Los Angeles-based anti-human trafficking organization
- College of Arts, Science and Technology, former name of the University of Technology, Jamaica
- Commercial Aviation Safety Team (CAST), an organization with the US FAA which provides safety recommendations for commercial aircraft
- Consolidated African Selection Trust (CAST) which became the Sierra Leone Selection Trust (SLST)
- Curriculum Advice and Support Team, former name of the Scottish Further Education Unit

== Technology ==
- CAST tool, a program for testing software
- CERN Axion Solar Telescope, an experiment in astroparticle physics to search for axions from the Sun
- Computer-aided simple triage, computerized methods or systems that assist physicians
- Computer-adaptive sequential testing, a type of multi-stage testing
- CRISPR-associated transposons, mobile genetic elements that have evolved to make use of minimal CRISPR systems for RNA-guided transposition of their DNA

== Other ==
- CAST (gene), which encodes the protein calpastatin
- CAST (race), a fictional race of androids in the Phantasy Star series of video games

== See also ==
- CAST-128, a block cipher in cryptography
- CAST-256, a block cipher in cryptography
- Cast (disambiguation)
