= Castaing =

Castaing is a surname. Notable people with the surname include:

- Edme Castaing (1796–1823), French physician and murderer
- Francis Castaing (born 1957), French bicycle racer
- François Castaing (born 1945), French automotive executive
- Jacques Chastenet de Castaing (1893–1978), French journalist, historian and diplomat
- Jean Castaing (fl. 1685–1700), French inventor and mint official
- Jean Castaing (playwright) (1723–1805), printer and playwright
- Lucien Castaing-Taylor (born 1966), British anthropologist and artist
- Madeleine Castaing (1894–1992), French antique dealer and interior designer

== See also ==
- Castang (disambiguation)
- Casting (disambiguation)
