= Colleges Scotland =

Colleges Scotland (Scottish Gaelic: Colaistean na h-Alba) is the umbrella organisation for the college sector in Scotland. It was rebranded in 2012 from the old name Scotland's Colleges. The Scottish Further Education Unit, its Continuing professional development arm, was also rebranded to College Development Network.

Colleges Scotland rolled up a number of previous Scottish higher education organizations, including Colleges Open Learning Exchange Group, a flexible educational materials exchange.

== See also ==
- List of further education colleges in Scotland
