= Alençon =

Alençon Alençoun (Norman)
- Prefecture and commune
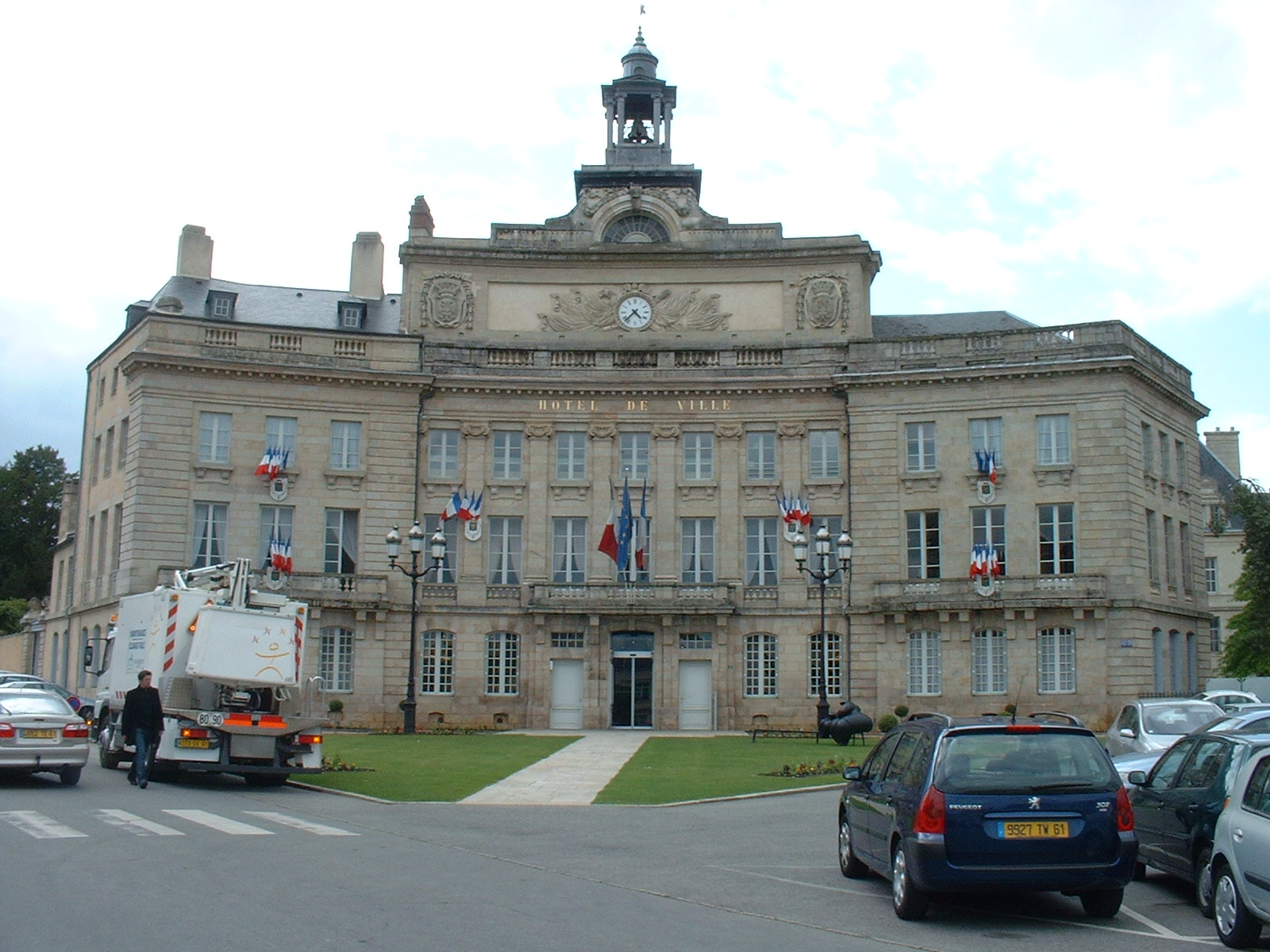
- The Hôtel de Ville

- Coat of arms
- Location of Alençon
- Location within France Location within Normandy
- Coordinates: 48°25′50″N 0°05′35″E
- Country: France
- Region: Normandy
- Department: Orne
- Arrondissement: Alençon
- Canton: Alençon-1 and 2
- Intercommunality: Alençon

Government
  - Mayor (2020–2026): Joachim Pueyo
- Area^{1}: 10.68 km^{2} (4.12 sq mi)
- Elevation: 135 m (443 ft)
- Highest elevation: 152 m (499 ft)
- Lowest elevation: 127 m (417 ft)
- Population (2023): 25,490
  - Density: 2,387/km^{2} (6,182/sq mi)
- Time zone: UTC+01:00 (CET)
  - Summer (DST): UTC+02:00 (CEST)
- INSEE/Postal code: 61001 /61000
- ^{1} French Land Register data, which excludes lakes, ponds, glaciers > 1 km^{2} (0.386 sq mi or 247 acres) and river estuaries.

Alençon (UK: /æˈlɒ̃sɒ̃/, US: /ˌælɒ̃ˈsoʊn/, French: [alɑ̃sɔ̃]; Norman: Alençoun) is a commune in Normandy, France, and the capital of the Orne department. It is situated between Paris and Rennes (about 173 kilometres (107 mi) west of Paris) and a little over 50 kilometres (31 mi) north of Le Mans. Alençon belongs to the intercommunality of Alençon (around 55,000 people in 2022, of which around 25,000 lived in Alençon).

== History ==
The name of Alençon is first recorded in a document dated in the seventh century. During the tenth century, Alençon was a buffer state between Normandy and the Maine regions.

In 1049–1051, William Duke of Normandy, later known as William the Conqueror and king of England, laid siege to the town, which had risen in support of the Count of Anjou along with two other towns of the Bellême estates, Domfront (then in Maine) and Bellême (held directly from King Henry I of France). According to Duke William's chaplain and panegyrist, William of Poitiers, the defenders of the fortress refused to surrender and mockingly waved animal hides from the castle walls, referencing William's lineage as the grandson of a tanner. In response, William had the hands and feet of 32 battle captives cut off, prompting a sudden surrender. Upon hearing of this event, the town of Domfront also surrendered.

Alençon was occupied by the English during the Anglo-Norman wars of 1113 to 1203.

The city became the seat of a dukedom in 1415, belonging to the sons of the King of France until the French Revolution, and some of them played important roles in French history: see Duke of Alençon. The French Revolution caused relatively little disorder in this area, although there were some royalist uprisings nearby.

A long-standing local fabric industry gave birth to the town's famous point d'Alençon lace in the 18th century. The economic development of the nineteenth century was based on iron foundries and mills in the surrounding region. In the first half of the twentieth century the city developed a flourishing printing industry.

Alençon was home to Sts. Louis Martin and Marie-Azélie Guérin, the parents of St. Thérèse of Lisieux. They were the first spouses in the history of the Catholic Church to be proposed for sainthood as a couple, in 2008. Zélie and Louis were married at the Basilica of Notre-Dame in Alençon on 13 July 1858 and spent their whole married life in Alençon, where Thérèse was born in January 1873 and spent her early childhood until the death of her mother in 1877. Beatification of Louis and Zelie Martin - Saint Therese of Lisieux

On 17 June 1940, the German Army occupied Alençon. On 12 August 1944, Alençon became the first French city to be liberated by the 2nd Armored Division of the French Army under General Leclerc, following a minor bombing campaign.

After the war, the population rapidly increased and modern industries settled. Many of these were centered on plastics, and the town now contains a major plastics educational centre.

== Geography ==
The river Sarthe flows through the town. In addition La Briante also flows through the commune. Alençon along with another 32 communes is part of a 3,503 hectare, Natura 2000 conservation area, called the Haute vallée de la Sarthe.

=== Climate ===
Alençon benefits from an oceanic climate with mild winters and temperate summers.

Climate data for Alençon, elevation: 143 m (469 ft) (1991–2020 normals, extremes 1946–present)
Month	Jan	Feb	Mar	Apr	May	Jun	Jul	Aug	Sep	Oct	Nov	Dec	Year
Record high °C (°F)	17.7 (63.9)	20.1 (68.2)	23.6 (74.5)	28.9 (84.0)	32.8 (91.0)	40.3 (104.5)	39.8 (103.6)	38.5 (101.3)	34.3 (93.7)	28.5 (83.3)	21.0 (69.8)	16.5 (61.7)	39.8 (103.6)
Mean daily maximum °C (°F)	7.4 (45.3)	8.6 (47.5)	12.0 (53.6)	15.2 (59.4)	18.6 (65.5)	21.9 (71.4)	24.3 (75.7)	24.4 (75.9)	20.9 (69.6)	16.0 (60.8)	10.9 (51.6)	7.8 (46.0)	15.7 (60.3)
Daily mean °C (°F)	4.7 (40.5)	5.2 (41.4)	7.7 (45.9)	10.1 (50.2)	13.4 (56.1)	16.6 (61.9)	18.7 (65.7)	18.7 (65.7)	15.5 (59.9)	12.0 (53.6)	7.8 (46.0)	5.0 (41.0)	11.3 (52.3)
Mean daily minimum °C (°F)	2.1 (35.8)	1.7 (35.1)	3.4 (38.1)	5.0 (41.0)	8.3 (46.9)	11.3 (52.3)	13.0 (55.4)	13.0 (55.4)	10.2 (50.4)	7.9 (46.2)	4.7 (40.5)	2.3 (36.1)	6.9 (44.4)
Record low °C (°F)	−17.4 (0.7)	−18.0 (−0.4)	−9.4 (15.1)	−5.2 (22.6)	−2.6 (27.3)	0.3 (32.5)	3.0 (37.4)	2.2 (36.0)	0.0 (32.0)	−6.0 (21.2)	−10.6 (12.9)	−17.0 (1.4)	−18.0 (−0.4)
Average precipitation mm (inches)	74.8 (2.94)	56.6 (2.23)	52.8 (2.08)	49.7 (1.96)	62.0 (2.44)	55.4 (2.18)	50.8 (2.00)	51.4 (2.02)	54.5 (2.15)	72.0 (2.83)	75.9 (2.99)	87.8 (3.46)	743.7 (29.28)
Average precipitation days (≥ 1.0 mm)	12.3	10.5	9.9	9.4	9.7	8.1	7.1	8.0	8.0	11.0	12.2	13.4	119.5
Average snowy days	3.8	3.8	2.8	1.1	0.1	0.0	0.0	0.0	0.0	0.0	1.3	2.5	15.4
Average relative humidity (%)	89	86	81	77	78	77	76	78	82	88	89	90	82.6
Mean monthly sunshine hours	60.4	89.2	134.0	173.6	198.0	214.7	222.3	213.6	173.7	111.9	72.6	63.1	1,727.1
Source 1: Meteociel
Source 2: Infoclimat.fr (humidity and snowy days, 1961–1990)

== Population ==
Historical population

Year	Pop.	±% p.a.
1793	12,954	—
1800	12,407	−0.61%
1806	13,222	+1.07%
1821	13,955	+0.36%
1836	13,934	−0.01%
1841	13,917	−0.02%
1846	14,388	+0.67%
1851	14,760	+0.51%
1856	16,473	+2.22%
1861	16,110	−0.44%
1866	16,115	+0.01%
1872	16,037	−0.08%
1876	16,615	+0.89%
1881	17,237	+0.74%
1886	17,550	+0.36%
1891	18,319	+0.86%
1896	17,841	−0.53%
1901	17,270	−0.65%

Year	Pop.	±% p.a.
1906	17,843	+0.65%
1911	17,378	−0.53%
1921	16,249	−0.67%
1926	16,044	−0.25%
1931	16,688	+0.79%
1936	17,731	+1.22%
1946	19,691	+1.05%
1954	21,893	+1.33%
1962	25,584	+1.97%
1968	31,656	+3.61%
1975	33,680	+0.89%
1982	31,608	−0.90%
1990	29,988	−0.66%
1999	28,935	−0.40%
2007	27,942	−0.44%
2012	26,305	−1.20%
2017	25,848	−0.35%
2023	25,490	−0.23%

Source: EHESS and INSEE (1968-2023)

=== Heraldry ===
Arms of Alençon	The arms of Alençon are blazoned : Azure, a double-headed eagle displayed Or.

== Economy ==
In the seventeenth century, Alençon was chiefly noted for its lace called point d'Alençon.

Today, Alençon is home to a prosperous plastics industry, and, since 1993, to a plastics engineering school.

MPO Fenêtres is a local PVC window company established in Alençon in 1970, is one of the first company in Alençon with around 170 employees (2009) and a turnover of 28 million euros in 2008. It is also the oldest French PVC window company still in business.

== Social Housing ==
The Champ Perrier social housing complex, with its four high-rise buildings, was inaugurated in 1962 and is now facing significant social challenges.

== Points of interest ==
=== Museums ===
- Musée des Beaux-arts et de la Dentelle d'Alençon a Museum of France dedicated to point d'Alençon and art, that has been open since 1981.
- Maison natale de Sainte Thérèse - birthplace of Saint Thérèse of Lisieux, with museum and basilica complex.

=== National heritage sites ===
The Commune has 31 buildings and areas listed as a Monument historique

- Le Château des Ducs is a Castle built in the Middle-ages.
- Municipal Library was a former Jesuit chapel built in 1620, it became the city's library in the 18th century. It was registered as a Monument in 1926.
- Prout sawmill and steam engine is a former sawmill, built in 1874, it was registered as a monument in 1995.
- Café la Renaissance, built in 1855 the cafe, its interior decor is inspired by the second French Renaissance, it was registered as a monument in 2009.
- Notre-Dame-de-Lorette Chapel is a seventeenth-century chapel, it was registered as a monument in 1975.
- Basilica of Notre-Dame d'Alençon is a fifteenth-century church, that was registered as a monument in 1862.
- Saint-Pierre church in the Montsor district is a church that was built in 1880, it features Mosaics made by the Facchina workshop, it was registered as a monument in 2006.
- The Wheat Market (Halle aux blé) was built in 1812, featuring a 1000 m² glass dome, with a circumference of 110 metres, it was registered as a monument in 1975.
- Psychiatric hospital was built in 1774, and initially built as a hospital for the sick, the destitute, the prisoners and the mentally ill. After the revolution it was turned into a prison, then becoming a hospice, before finally becoming a psychiatric hospital. It was registered as a monument in 1974.
- Le Grand Cerf is a nineteenth-century hotel, that was registered as a monument in 2008.
- Hotel Libert is a hotel dating back to the 18th century, registered as a monument in 1947.
- Hotel Radigue is a hotel dating back to the 18th century, registered as a monument in 1960. The hotel was mentioned in the Honoré de Balzac novel La Vieille Fille.
- Hôtel de la préfecture, formerly known as the Hôtel de Guise is a hotel (a hotel in France usually means a large building that now houses some sort of office, in this case the prefecture) dating back to the seventeenth century, registered as a monument in 1903.
- The Hôtel de Ville dates back to 1788 and was registered as a monument in 1926.
- Saint-Pierre de Montsort Presbytery is a former hotel that might have served as a presbytery, it was built in 1639 and was listed as a monument in 1958.
- Saint-Léonard Lodging house is a seventeenth-century house, designated as a monument in 1975.
- Pesche Pharmacy is a nineteenth-century building with neo-classical decor very characteristic of the 1820s-1830s, it was listed as a monument in 1987.
- Tribunal de commerce is a fifteenth-century building used as a court house for Commercial matters, it was registered as a monument in 1958.
- City Ramparts remains of the old sixteenth-century ramparts, reworked on in the nineteenth century, they were listed as a monument in 1971.
- House of Ozé a fifteenth-century house, built entirely from granite. The house was registered as a monument in 1903, and now acts as the Tourist office for the Commune.

There are a further eleven private buildings and houses listed as monuments with the commune.

=== Architecture contemporaine remarquable ===
The Commune has 3 buildings listed as being Architecture contemporaine remarquable

- Former bus station - The bus station was built in 1958 and designed by architect Roger Vissuzaine, in 2007 it was awarded the Architecture contemporaine remarquable label.
- Water tower - Designed by architect Maurice Novarina in 1964, in 2007 it was awarded the Architecture contemporaine remarquable label.
- Moulinex Building - former building belonging to Moulinex and designed by architects Maurice Novarina in 1964, 2007 saw the building awarded the Architecture contemporaine remarquable label.

== Education ==
=== Primary education ===
Alençon has 16 elementary schools (Écoles élémentaire, these are typical of France, see the article in the French Wikipedia), of which 12 are public and 4 are private.

=== Secondary education ===
- Alençon has 6 colleges, 4 of which are public and 2 are private.
- Alençon also has several lycées, some of which are public and some are private.
- There are also 2 schools which provide vocational education.

=== Higher education ===
- Alençon has a branch of the University of Caen Normandy, specifically for law and engineering.
- There is also a technical university.
- There is a training institute for teachers (Institut national supérieur du professorat et de l'éducation)

== Transport ==
Alençon is linked by the A28 autoroute (motorway/freeway) with the nearby cities of Le Mans to the south (Sarthe) and Rouen (Seine-Maritime) to the north. The A88 autoroute links the A28 just north of Alençon to the coastal port of Caen.

The Alençon railway station offers regional services towards Caen, Le Mans and Tours. A comprehensive town bus system operates from 7:00 to 19:00.

Aérodrome d'Alençon - Valframbert is an Aerodrome within the commune which is also shared with neighbouring communes of Valframbert and Cerisé that opened in 1936. Its IATA airport code is XAN and its ICAO airport code is LFOF.

There is a comprehensive network of cycle paths.

== Sport ==
- Alençon has a football team US Alençon who play at the Jacques Fould stadium.
- Hippodrome d'Alençon is a racecourse that specializes in Harness racing, it has been in operation since 1825.

== Notable people ==
- Adela of Ponthieu, Countess of Surrey (c. 1110–1174)
- Anne d'Alençon (1492–1562), marquise of Montferrat
- Marie-Catherine de Villedieu (1640–1683), novelist
- Pierre Allix (1641–1717), Protestant pastor and author
- Jean Castaing (1723–1805), printer, playwright lived and died here.
- Charles Éléonor Dufriche-Valazé (1751 - 1793) jurist, lawyer, and politician of the French Revolution.
- Léonard Bourdon (1754–1807), revolutionist
- Jacques Hébert (1757–1794), editor of the extreme radical newspaper Le Père Duchesne during the French Revolution
- Louis de Frotté (1766–1800), Chouan general
- Jean Pierre François Bonet, Military commander
- Edme Castaing (1796–1824), doctor and murderer
- Jacques-Julien Houtou de Labillardière (1755–1834), botanist
- Auguste Poulet-Malassis (1825–1878), publisher and friend of Baudelaire
- Juste Lisch (1828–1910), architect
- Marie-Azélie Guérin Martin (1831–1877), the mother of St. Thérèse of Lisieux who, along with her husband Louis Martin, is one of the few married couples ever to be beatified by the Catholic Church.
- Raoul Le Mouton de Boisdeffre (1839–1919), general
- Éléonore-Aglaé-Marie Despierres (1843–1895), historian
- Adolphe Gérard (1844–1900), American restaurateur
- Adhémar Leclère (1853–1917), author
- Georges de Lagarenne (1856 - 1929), an equestrian
- Thérèse de Lisieux (1873–1897), Roman Catholic nun and saint, and one of only 33 Doctors of the Church
- Louis Barillet (1880–1948), glass blower
- André Couder (1897–1979), astronomer
- Christian Beauvalet (1929 - 2022), a modern pentathlete was born here.
- Pierre Papillaud, (1935 – 2017) a French billionaire businessman died here.
- Alain Lambert (born 1946), politician
- Daniel Balavoine (1952–1986), singer and songwriter
- Fabrice Poullain (born 1962), footballer
- Anne Consigny (born 1963), actress
- Yoann (born 1971), graphic artist
- Laurence Leboucher (born 1972), cyclist
- Lorànt Deutsch (born 1975), actor and writer
- Benoît Tréluyer (born 1976), car racer, two-time winner of the Le Mans 24 Hours
- Jonathan Cochet (born 1977), car racer
- Jérôme Hiaumet (born 1979), footballer
- Anthony Geslin (born 1980), cyclist
- Orelsan (born 1982), rapper
- Arnold Mvuemba (born 1985), footballer
- Maxime Blanchard (born 1986), footballer
- Agnès Raharolahy (born 1992), athlete specialising in the 400 metres and 800 metres.
- Lucas Corvée (born 1993) a badminton player.
- Jordan Corvée (born 1995), is a badminton player
- Rémy Vita (born 2001), footballer

== Twin towns – sister cities ==
Alençon is twinned with:

- Basingstoke and Deane, England, United Kingdom
- Quakenbrück, Germany

== Gallery ==
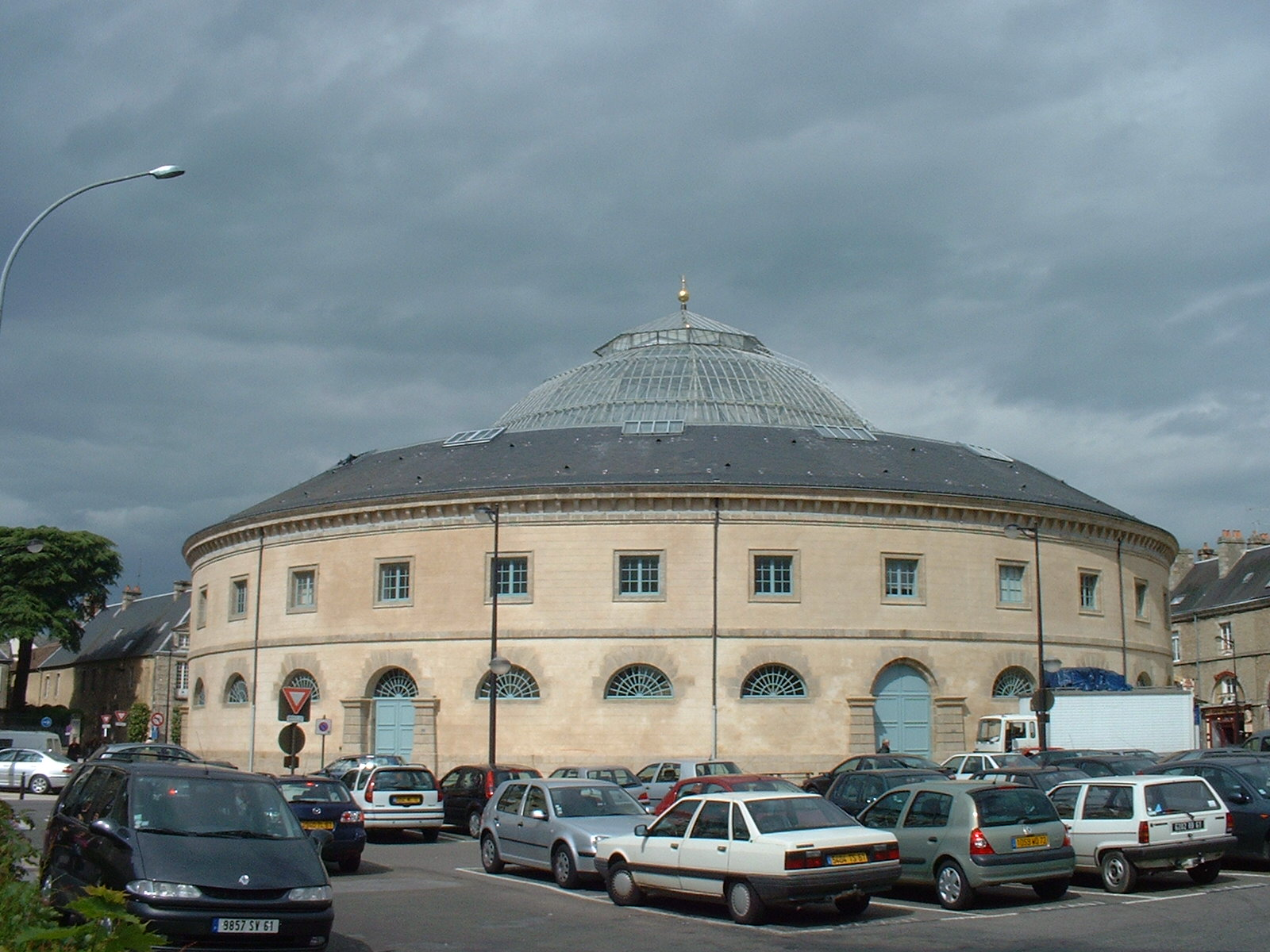
La Halle aux Blé

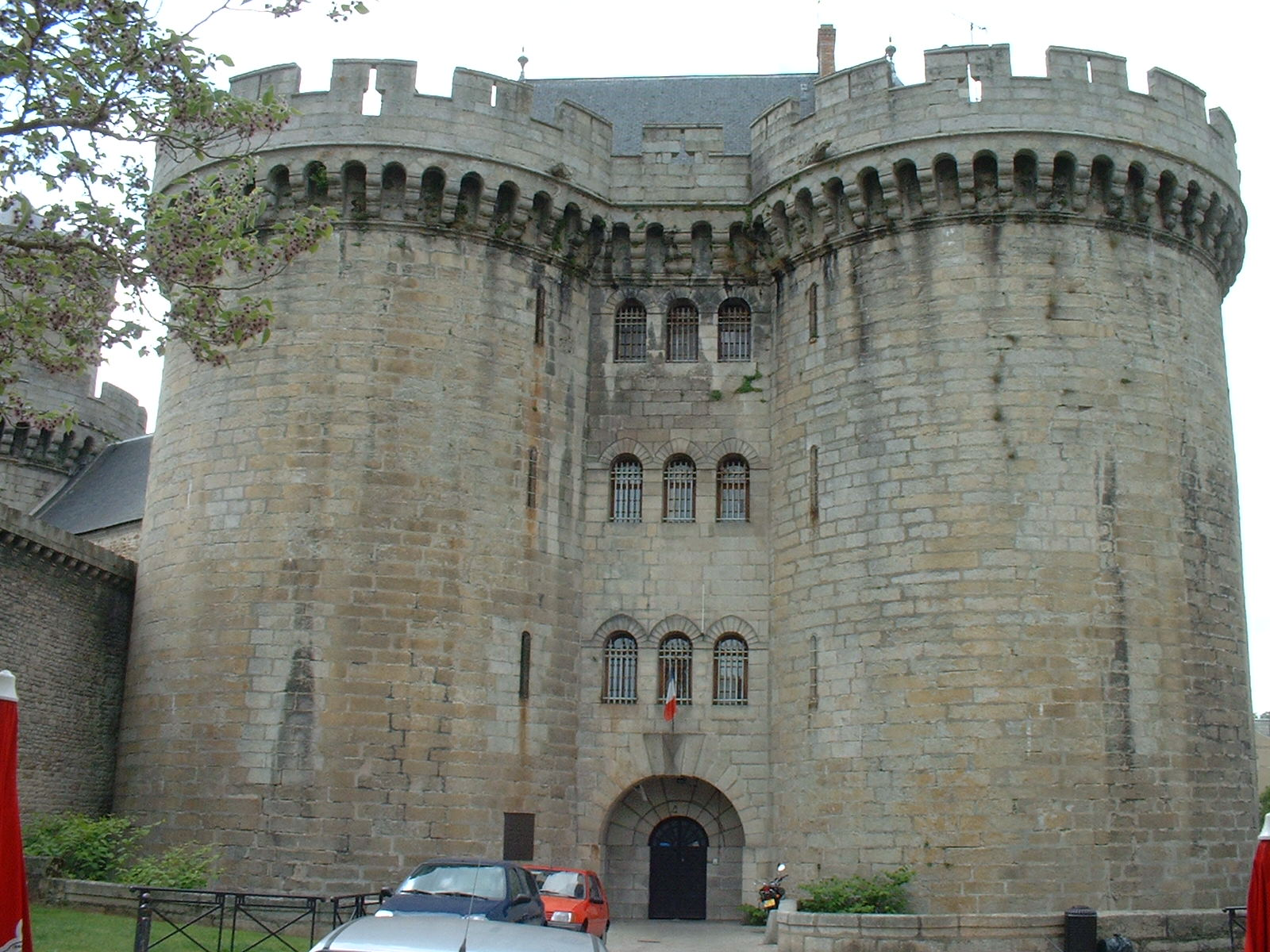
Château des Ducs

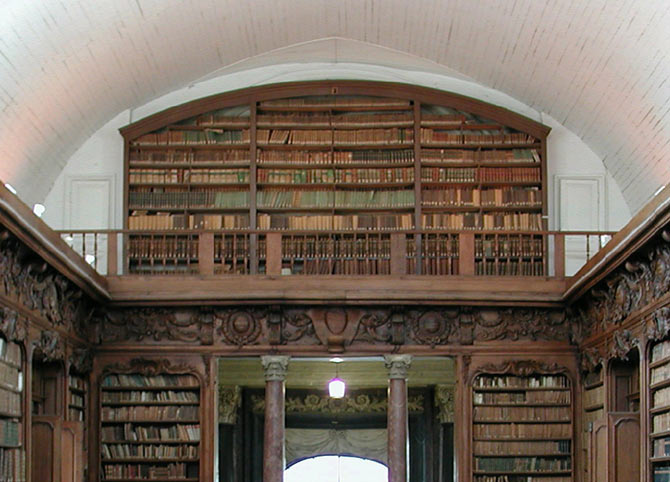
Library

== See also ==
- Alençon lace
- Communes of the Orne department
