= Hôtel de Ville, Alençon =

Town hall in Alençon, France

Hôtel de Ville
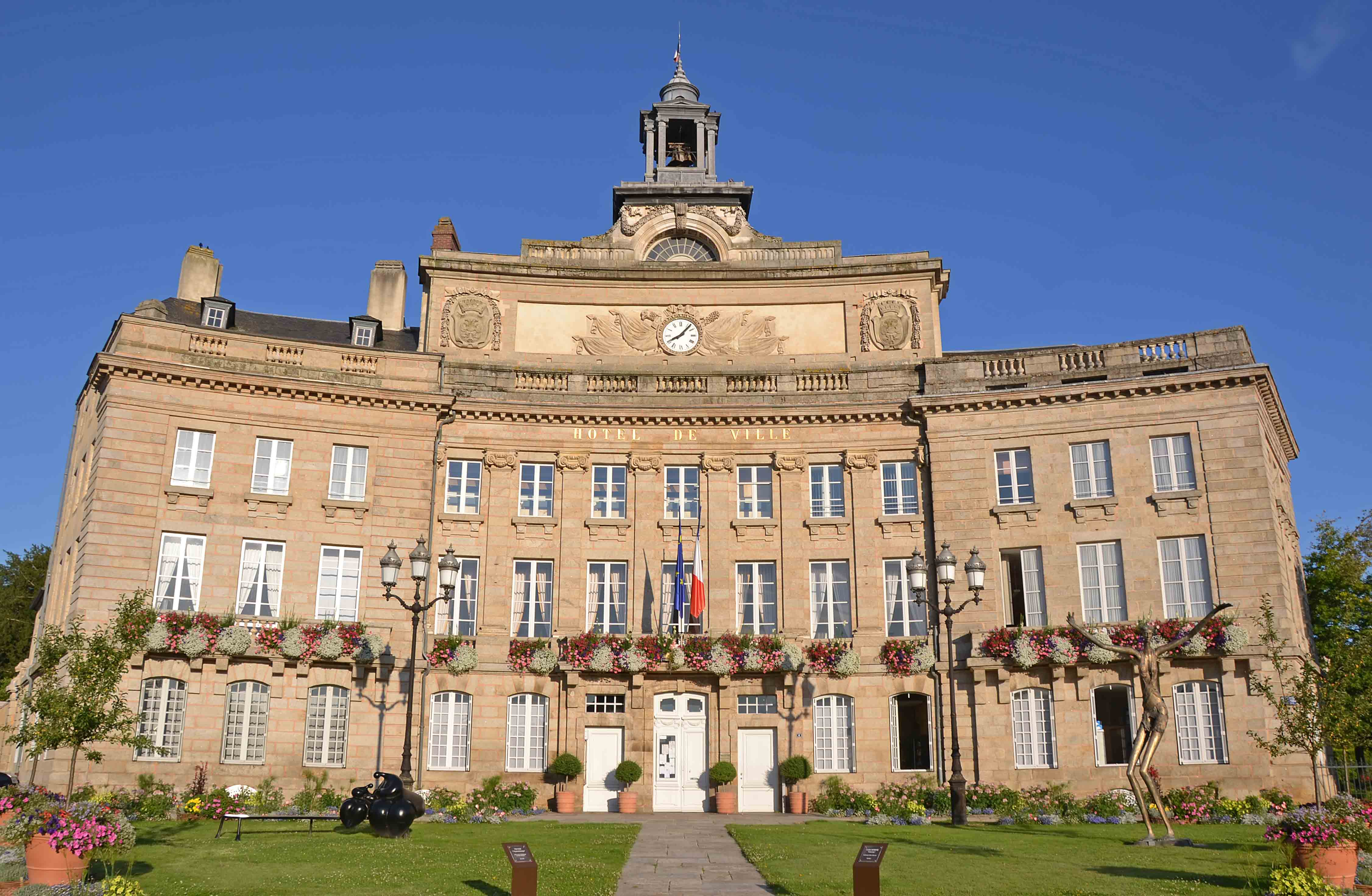
- The main frontage of the Hôtel de Ville in August 2012

General information
- Type: City hall
- Architectural style: Louis XVI style
- Location: Alençon, France
- Coordinates: 48.4302°N 0.0821°E
- Completed: 1788

Design and construction
- Architect: Jean Delarue

Monument historique
- Official name: Hôtel de ville
- Type: Inscrit
- Designated: 1926
- Reference no.: PA00110698

The Hôtel de Ville (French pronunciation: [otɛl də vil], City Hall) is a municipal building in Alençon, Orne, in northwestern France, standing on Place du Maréchal Foch. It was designated a monument historique by the French government in 1926.

== History ==
The first town hall in Alençon was commissioned by William III, Count of Ponthieu and Alençon in the 12th century. This was destroyed by English troops during the Hundred Years' War and replaced by a second town hall, commissioned by Louis XI, on Rue aux Goguets (now Rue de l'Ancienne-Mairie) in 1473. A third town hall was established on Place du Palais in 1650, and a fourth town hall was erected on Rue du Jeudi in 1728.

In the early 1780s, after the fourth town hall became dilapidated, the consuls decided to commission a new building. The site they selected had formed part of the grounds of the Château of the Dukes d'Alençon. Work on the new building started in 1783. It was designed by Jean Delarue in the Louis XVI style, built in ashlar stone and was completed in 1788.

The design involved a curved main frontage of 13 bays facing onto what is now Place du Maréchal Foch with the end sections of three bays each slightly projected forward. The central section of seven bays featured three doorways on the ground floor and three French doors with a balustraded balcony on the first floor. The remainder of the building was fenestrated by segmental headed windows on the ground floor, by casement windows with balustrades on the first floor and by casement windows with windowsills on the second floor. The bays of the central section were flanked by Ionic order pilasters supporting a modillioned cornice, a balustraded parapet and, above the central section, a rectangular pediment containing a clock which was flanked by coats of arms. The main pediment was surmounted by a smaller pediment, containing a Diocletian window and topped by an ornate belfry. Internally, the principal room was the Salle du Conseil et des Mariages (the council chamber and wedding room).

In 1966, during the renovation of the building, contractors discovered a series of posters published by the jurist and Girondin, Charles Éléonor Dufriche-Valazé, in June 1793. Dufriche-Valazé had been one of the "Commission of the Twenty-One" which had presented charges against Louis XVI. Dufriche-Valazé was subsequently arrested by the national guard, tried by a revolutionary court and condemned to death. In the posters, he protested about the arbitrary measures taken against him.

A sculpture, depicting a female figure, by the sculptor, Louis Derbré, was installed in front of the building in 2007.
