= Recast =

Recast may refer to:

- Recast (comics), a Korean comic
- Recast (language teaching), a language teaching technique
- Recast (manhwa), a six-volume manhwa series
- Amazon Fire TV Recast, an over-the-air DVR
- Recasting (EU Law), a method of updating EU legislation.

== See also ==
- Casting (disambiguation)
