= Scottish Further Education Unit =

The Scottish Further Education Unit (SFEU) was a development agency which supported the development of teaching and learning in the country. It was founded in 1985 as the Curriculum Advice and Support Team (CAST), and renamed to SFEU in 1991 when it became a government-sponsored non-departmental public body. In June 2009 SFEU merged with the Association of Scotland’s Colleges (ASC), Colleges Open Learning Exchange Group (COLEG) and Scotland’s Colleges International (SCI) to form Scotland’s Colleges.
