= Recast (manhwa) =

South Korean manhwa series

- Cover of the English version of Recast vol. 1

리캐스트 RR: Rikaeseuteu MR: Rik'aesŭt'ŭ
- Genre: Fantasy; Magic
- Author: Seung-Hui Kye
- Publisher: (South Korea) Daewon C.I.
- English publisher: (United States) Tokyopop
- Other publishers: (France) Tokebi (Germany) Tokyopop
- Original run: 2003–2004
- Volumes: 6

Recast (Korean: 리캐스트) is a six-volume Korean manhwa series written and illustrated by Seung-Hui Kye and originally published in South Korea by Daewon C.I. from November 15, 2003 to November 15, 2004. The series was licensed in English by Tokyopop, who released the first volume on November 7, 2006, and volume 6 on June 10, 2008. The series has also been licensed in German by Tokyopop Germany, and in French by Tokebi.

== Plot ==
The main character JD is not an ordinary child. He is a "Recast", meaning that he was created from someone's life force, and in this case that person being his "Grandpa". Before his Grandpa Grifford used up a big chunk of his own life force, he was an immortal, handsome, and powerful magician. JD has a weapon that can change into anything that he can imagine it to be. Throughout the series, he is pursued by bounty hunters.

=== Worlds ===
Three circular world levels are discussed in the series: Fourth World, Fifth World, and Sixth World. The Fourth World (also known as Hell) is the inner level where Demons live. People who serve this world are referred to as Puppets. The Sixth World is the outer level where Gods live. 90% of people worship these Gods, living by their morals and rules. The Fifth World is the space in between those worlds where common people live. It is divided into the lower level, which encircles the Fourth World, and the upper level, which is encircled by the Sixth World. The levels are upside down to each other with the sky and Waterway in between. The Waterway is the only way to travel between them, and is only active at a certain time of year. JD's Grandpa moved from the Fourth World to the Fifth World.

== Volume list ==
| No. | Original release date | Original ISBN | English release date | English ISBN |
|---|---|---|---|---|
| 1 | November 15, 2003 | 8-952-86753-X | November 7, 2006 | 978-1-59816-664-4 |
| 2 | November 15, 2003 | 8-952-86754-8 | March 13, 2007 | 978-1-59816-665-1 |
| 3 | December 23, 2003 | 8-952-86915-X | July 10, 2007 | 978-1-59816-666-8 |
| 4 | April 1, 2004 | 8-952-87357-2 | November 13, 2007 | 978-1-59816-667-5 |
| 5 | July 16, 2004 | 8-952-87922-8 | February 12, 2008 | 978-1-59816-668-2 |
| 6 | November 15, 2004 | 8-952-88552-X | June 10, 2008 | 978-1-59816-669-9 |

== Reception ==
Carl Kimlinger of Anime News Network said that the first volume will only appeal to sword-and-sorcery fans who are hard up for some entertainment. Leroy Douresseaux of Comic Book Bin said that the art resembles American art and that he likes the artwork. A.E. Sparrow of IGN compares volume 1 favorably with Harry Potter, stating "[i]f you ... can't wait for Rowling to finish the final Potter book, Recast might be worth your time".
