= Keefa Kamya =

Samuel Keefa Kamya Ssemakula
- Bishop of West Buganda
- Church: Anglican Church of Uganda
- Diocese: West Buganda
- Term ended: January 2011
- Successor: Godfrey Makumbi

Personal details
- Born: Uganda
- Denomination: Anglican

Samuel Keefa Kamya Ssemakula, also known as Keefa Kamya, is a Ugandan Anglican cleric who served as the fourth Bishop of the West Buganda Diocese in the Church of Uganda. He retired from the diocesan episcopate in January 2011.

== Ministry and episcopate ==
Samuel Keefa Kamya Ssemakula served in parishes and diocesan ministry before being appointed Bishop of West Buganda. He was the fourth bishop of the diocese, serving in that office until his retirement in January 2011. His immediate successor, Godfrey Makumbi, was consecrated and enthroned as the Bishop of West Buganda on January 23, 2011.

== Retirement and later activities ==
After retirement, Kamya remained active in Church life and public discussions on church matters. He spoke publicly about the financial difficulties faced by retired clergy in Uganda and the need for improved support systems for retired priests and Bishops.

== Controversy ==
In December 2010, shortly before his retirement, Kamya was involved in a widely reported incident at Masaka High Court in which a photojournalist, Brian Luwagga, alleged that the bishop grabbed and attempted to strangle him after the journalist had taken photographs of the bishop in court. The incident was covered by several Ugandan and international news outlets; the bishop later issued an apology for the matter, as it had been the subject of a criminal complaint and of media coverage at the time..

== See also ==
- Church of Uganda
- West Buganda Diocese
- Godfrey Makumbi
- Gaster Nsereko
- List of Anglican bishops in Uganda
