= Siege of Alençon =

The siege of Alençon occurred in the town of Alençon, in present-day France, in the year 1047. It was fought between William the Conqueror, duke of the Duchy of Normandy, and Geoffrey II, Count of Anjou and his supporters.

The battle started over the Count of Anjou claiming the semi-autonomous region of Maine, which was a contested border territory between Normandy and Anjou. Supporters of the Count of Anjou seized Alençon and another fortress at Domfront. During their occupation of the town, the rebels hung animal hides, a reference to his mother being the daughter of a tanner. In response to this, after the surrender of Alençon, William had the rebels' hands and feet cut off so as to defend his mother's honor. This victory made William the undisputed Duke of Normandy.
