= Essay, Orne =

Essay
- Commune
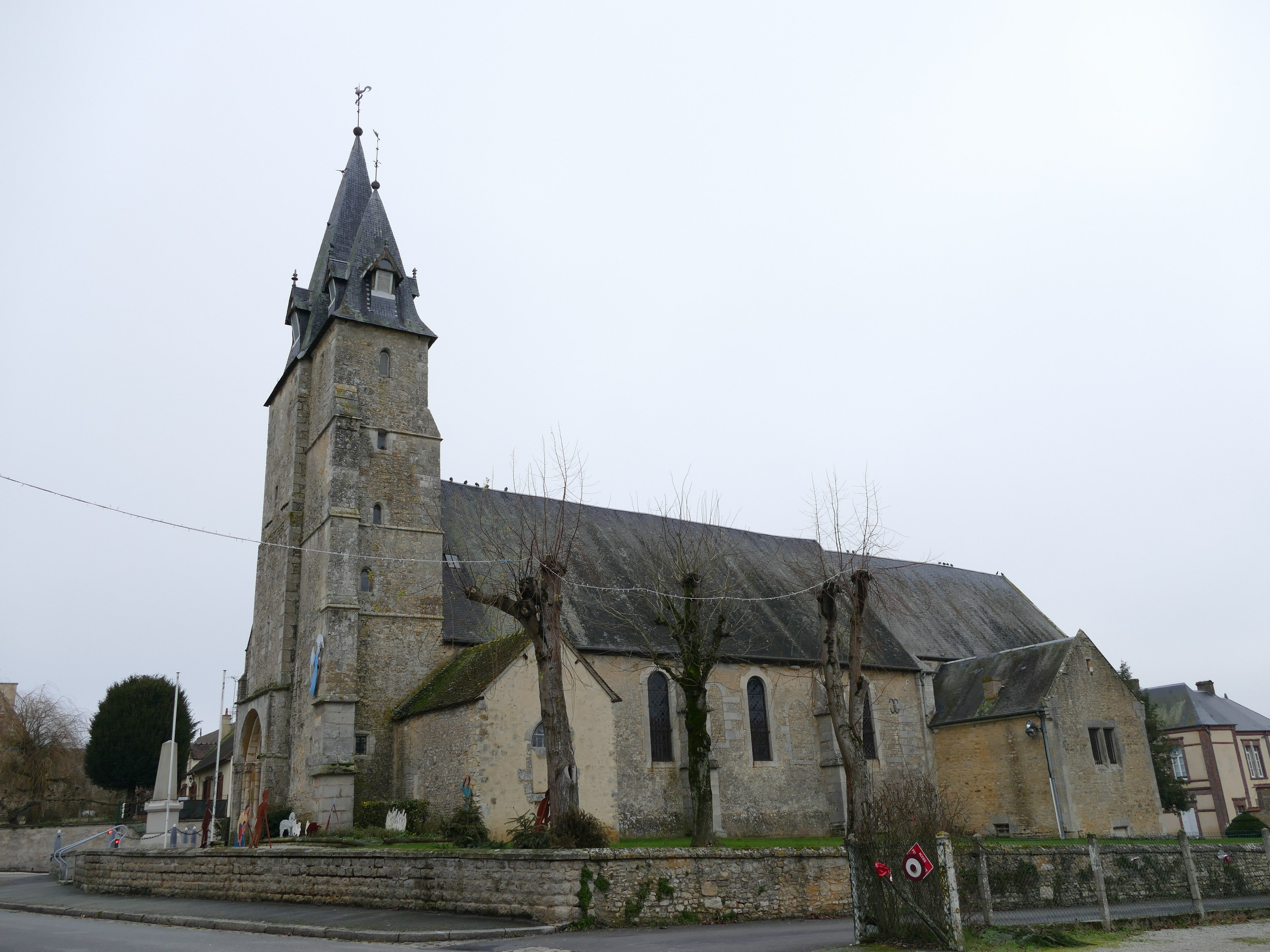
- The church in Essay
- Location of Essay
- Location within France Location within Normandy
- Coordinates: 48°32′30″N 0°14′52″E
- Country: France
- Region: Normandy
- Department: Orne
- Arrondissement: Alençon
- Canton: Écouves
- Intercommunality: Sources de l'Orne

Government
  - Mayor (2020–2026): Pascale Leroy
- Area^{1}: 15.99 km^{2} (6.17 sq mi)
- Elevation: 160 m (520 ft)
- Highest elevation: 206 m (676 ft)
- Lowest elevation: 141 m (463 ft)
- Population (2023): 556
  - Density: 34.8/km^{2} (90.1/sq mi)
- Time zone: UTC+01:00 (CET)
  - Summer (DST): UTC+02:00 (CEST)
- INSEE/Postal code: 61156 /61500
- ^{1} French Land Register data, which excludes lakes, ponds, glaciers > 1 km^{2} (0.386 sq mi or 247 acres) and river estuaries.

Essay (French pronunciation: [ɛsɛ]) is a commune in the Orne department in north-western France. The town is mainly known nowadays for its motorsports tracks, and hosted a round of the 2011 European Rallycross Championship.

== Geography ==
Essay is made up of the following collection of villages and hamlets, Beaufossé, Montperroux, Echuffley and La Renouillère.

The commune is in the Normandie-Maine Regional Natural Park.

A river, La Vézone, flows through the commune.

== Notable buildings and places ==
- Le circuit des Ducs - is a racing circuit that was built in 1975. The circuit that has been used to stage a round of the French rallycross championship and Fol'Car races.

=== National heritage sites ===
The commune has two buildings/areas listed as a Monument historique.

- Domaine de Beaufossé is an 18th-century house and estate, declared as a Monument historique in 2001. The gardens of the estate were landscaped by Henri and Achille Duchêne. The estate grounds are shared with the neighbouring commune of Boitron.
- Chapel of the Dukes of Alençon is a 12th-century chapel that was part of a castle originally built by William of Bellême in 1088. It was listed as a monument in 1975.

== Notable people ==
- Marie d'Alençon (1373 – 1417) a French noblewoman, a Princess of the Blood, and the wife of Jean VII of Harcourt was born here.
- John I, Duke of Alençon (1385 – 1415), a French nobleman was born here.
- François Robichon de La Guérinière (1688–1751) was a French riding master and one of the most influential writers on the art of dressage, was born here.
- Charles Éléonor Dufriche-Valazé (1751 - 1793) jurist, lawyer, and politician of the French Revolution was the first mayor of Essay in 1790.
- Pierre Louis Roederer - (1754 –1835) a French politician, economist, and historian became mayor here in 1830.

== See also ==
- Communes of the Orne department
- Normandie-Maine Regional Natural Park
