= Boitron, Orne =

Boitron
- Commune
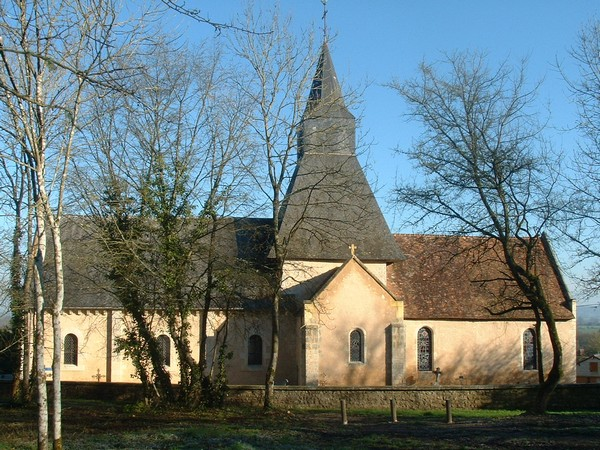
- The church in Boitron
- Location of Boitron
- Location within France Location within Normandy
- Coordinates: 48°33′40″N 0°15′50″E
- Country: France
- Region: Normandy
- Department: Orne
- Arrondissement: Alençon
- Canton: Sées

Government
  - Mayor (2020–2026): Patrick Fleuriel
- Area^{1}: 13.35 km^{2} (5.15 sq mi)
- Elevation: 225 m (738 ft)
- Highest elevation: 224 m (735 ft)
- Lowest elevation: 152 m (499 ft)
- Population (2023): 349
  - Density: 26.1/km^{2} (67.7/sq mi)
- Time zone: UTC+01:00 (CET)
  - Summer (DST): UTC+02:00 (CEST)
- INSEE/Postal code: 61051 /61500
- ^{1} French Land Register data, which excludes lakes, ponds, glaciers > 1 km^{2} (0.386 sq mi or 247 acres) and river estuaries.

Boitron (French pronunciation: [bwatʁɔ̃]) is a commune in the Orne department in northwestern France.

== Geography ==
The commune is made up of the following collection of villages and hamlets, Les Loges, La Maison Rocher, Ave, La Grande Ramée, La Buntière, La Houardière, Boitron and Mésiliée.

Two rivers, la Tanche and La Vézone flow through the commune.

The commune is in the Normandie-Maine Regional Natural Park.

== Population ==
Historical population
Year	Pop.	±% p.a.
1968	297	—
1975	262	−1.78%
1982	263	+0.05%
1990	219	−2.26%
1999	215	−0.20%
2007	324	+5.26%
2012	344	+1.21%
2017	354	+0.57%
2023	349	−0.24%
Source: INSEE

== Points of Interest ==
- La butte de Boitron is a tower on the remains of a medieval Keep on top of a 225 metre high hill. The Tower is a former mill.

=== National heritage sites ===
- Domaine de Beaufossé is an 18th-century house and estate, declared as a Monument historique in 2001. The gardens of the estate were landscaped by Henri and Achille Duchêne. The estate grounds are shared with the neighbouring commune of Essay.

== See also ==
- Communes of the Orne department
- Parc naturel régional Normandie-Maine
