= Bérus =

- Commune
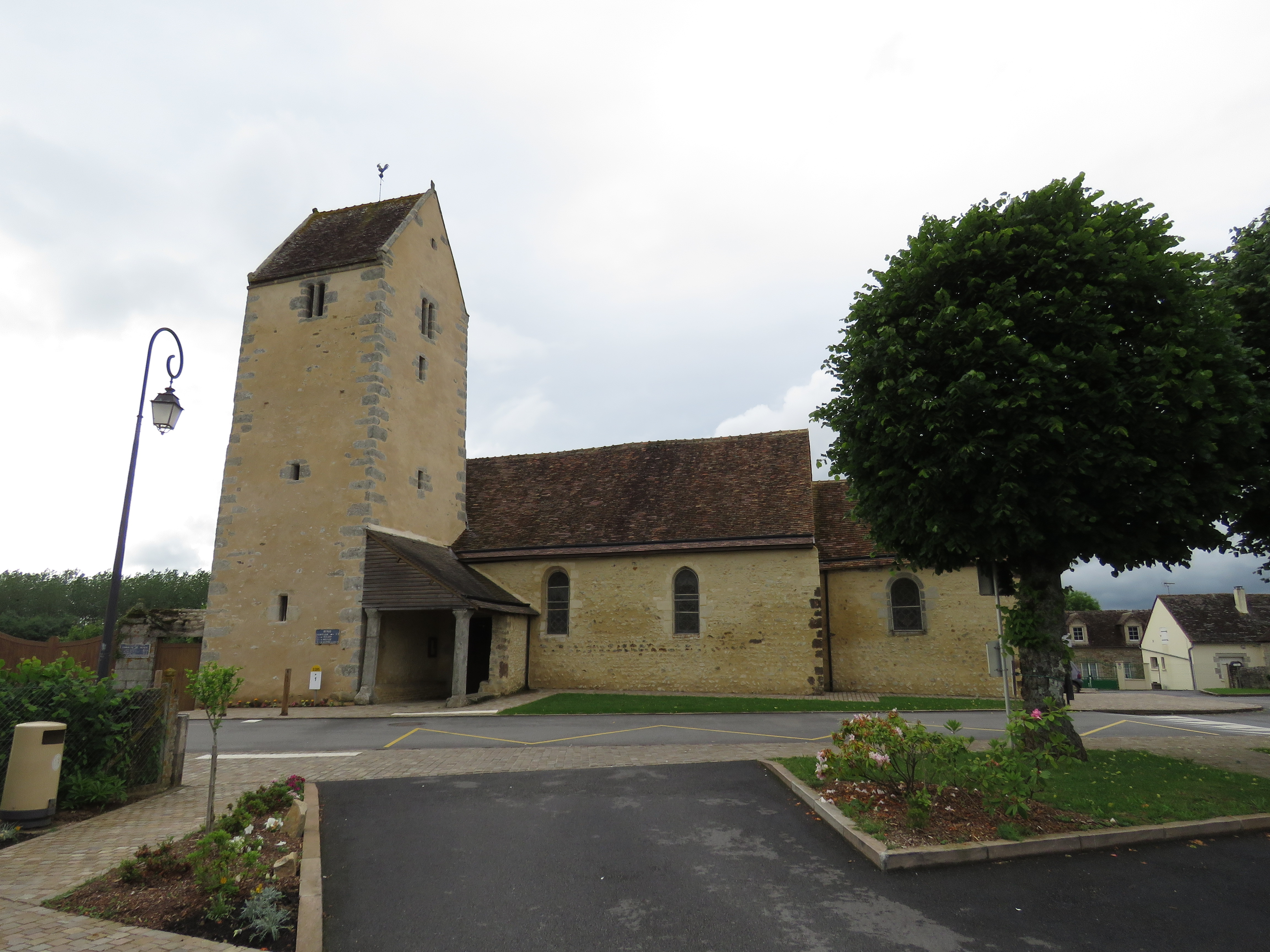
- The church in Bérus

- Coat of arms
- Location of Bérus
- Location within France Location within Pays de la Loire
- Coordinates: 48°22′27″N 0°03′03″E
- Country: France
- Region: Pays de la Loire
- Department: Sarthe
- Arrondissement: Mamers
- Canton: Sillé-le-Guillaume
- Intercommunality: Haute Sarthe Alpes Mancelles

Government
  - Mayor (2020–2026): Gérard Evette
- Area^{1}: 6.73 km^{2} (2.60 sq mi)
- Highest elevation: 196 m (643 ft)
- Lowest elevation: 141 m (463 ft)
- Population (2023): 435
  - Density: 64.6/km^{2} (167/sq mi)
- Demonym: Bérusiens
- Time zone: UTC+01:00 (CET)
  - Summer (DST): UTC+02:00 (CEST)
- INSEE/Postal code: 72034 /72610
- ^{1} French Land Register data, which excludes lakes, ponds, glaciers > 1 km^{2} (0.386 sq mi or 247 acres) and river estuaries.

Bérus is a commune in the Sarthe department in the region of Pays de la Loire in north-western France.

== Geography ==
The commune is made up of the following collection of villages and hamlets, La Feuillère, Bérus, La Palestine and Boisdeffre.

== Notable people ==
- Raoul Le Mouton de Boisdeffre - (1839 – 1919) a French Army general who is buried at the cemetery in Bérus.

== See also ==
- Communes of the Sarthe department
