= Raoul Le Mouton de Boisdeffre =

French army general (1839-1919)

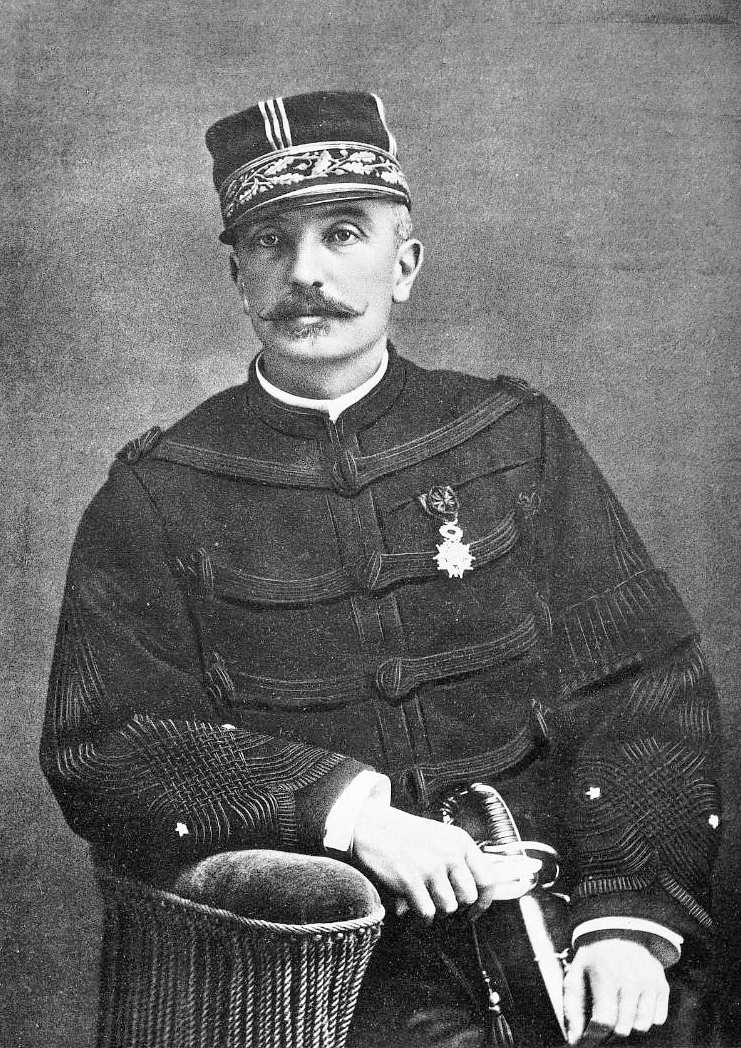
- Raoul Le Mouton de Boisdeffre
- Born: Raoul François Charles Le Mouton de Boisdeffre; 6 February 1839; Alençon
- Died: 24 August 1919 (aged 80); Paris
- Resting place: Bérus
- Education: École spéciale militaire de Saint-Cyr
- Occupation: classical singer
- Employer: French Military
- Title: Chief of Staff of the French Army

Raoul François Charles Le Mouton de Boisdeffre, or more commonly Raoul de Boisdeffre (6 February 1839, Alençon – 24 August 1919, Paris) was a French Army general.

== Biography ==
He studied at the College of Saint Cyr and at the Staff-College. During the Franco-Prussian War he was a major of cavalry and aide-de-camp of General Antoine Chanzy, and in 1882 was promoted to colonel. In 1890 he became assistant chief-of-staff, and in 1893 he was named Chief of Staff of the French Army. He was consulted on the 1894 French Military Treaty with Russia and had met both Tsars Alexander III and Nicholas II. Boisdeffre is possibly most known for his comment to Tsar Alexander "Mobilisation IS war!" to which the Tsar replied "That is as I understand it." Nicholas received Boisdeffre twice when he visited France.

At the trial of Émile Zola for criminal libel (1898), during the Dreyfus affair, he appeared full-uniformed in court, and in a much-applauded address to the jury, affirmed the existence of a third secret document incriminating the accused officer. When subsequently it transpired, through the confession of Lieutenant Colonel Hubert-Joseph Henry, that the document to which he had referred in good faith was a forgery, he tendered his resignation and retired from public life.

== Notable people ==
- Stanislas du Lac (1835–1909) French Jesuit, educationist social worker, enigmatic figure in the background to the Dreyfus Affair
