= Stanislas du Lac =

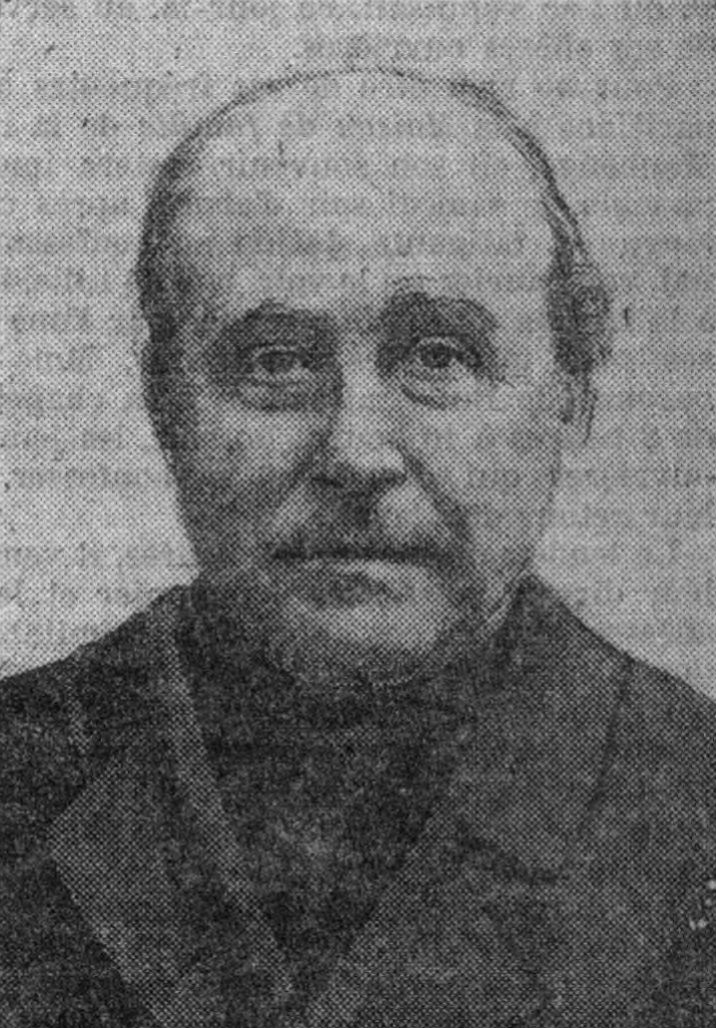
Stanislas du Lac

Stanislas du Lac (Paris, 21 November 1835 – Paris, 30 August 1909) was a French Jesuit, educationist, social worker, and an enigmatic figure in the background to the Dreyfus Affair.

== Life ==
His father, Louis Paul Albert du Lac de Fugères, was descended from a noble family, and his mother was Camille de Rouvroy de Lamairie. Entering into the novitiate of the Society of Jesus at Issenheim in Alsace, 28 October 1853, he studied theology at Laval until 1869, when he was ordained priest by Casimir Wicart, 19 September.

The following summer (1870), he was made rector of the new College of Sainte-Croix at Le Mans, where, during the Franco-Prussian war, he organized an efficient hospital service. During the ten months of his rectorship at Le Mans, twenty-two thousand soldiers sojourned successively in his college.

In October 1871, he succeeded Léon Ducoudray as Rector of the Ecole Sainte-Geneviève, generally called "La Rue des Postes", an institution which prepared candidates for the great military and scientific schools of France. During his rectorship, from 1872 to 1881, 213 of his pupils were admitted to the Ecole Centrale, 328 to the École Polytechnique, and 830 to Saint-Cyr.

In 1880, he founded a new French college, St. Mary's, at Canterbury, England, where he remained as rector nine years. The last twenty years of his life were spent in Paris and Versailles, as preacher, director of souls, and founder of the "Syndicat de l'Aiguille", a collection of loan and benefit societies for needlewomen, dressmakers, seamstresses, especially those young sewing girls who are called midinettes.

== Dreyfus Affair ==
The reputation of du Lac among the military was high, and he was confessor to Boisdeffre, prominent in the Dreyfus Affair. Joseph Reinach, pioneer historian of the Affair, believed in a Jesuit conspiracy against the Republic in which du Lac was implicated. The involvement of the Jesuits in general, and du Lac in particular, is now described as a myth, set off by Frederick Conybeare, and given substance by Reinach; the thought that there was a Jesuit conspiracy to prevent the rehabilitation of Alfred Dreyfus is called "demonstrably a total delusion".

== Works ==
He wrote two books: "France" (Paris, 1888), which vividly portrays the affectionate relations between the Rector of St. Mary's, Canterbury, and his French boys; and "Jésuites" (Paris, 1901), a defence of the Society of Jesus, containing many autobiographical reminiscences.
