= Castang =

Castang may refer to:

- Jeanne-Germaine Castang (1878-1897), French nun, Sister Marie-Céline of the Presentation, beatified in 2007
- Veronica Castang (1938—1988), British film, stage and television actress
- Henri Castang, a fictional detective in works by Nicolas Freeling
- Mauzac-et-Grand-Castang, a commune in the Dordogne department in Aquitaine in southwestern France

== See also ==
- Castaing
- Casting (disambiguation)
