= Musée des Beaux-Arts et de la Dentelle d'Alençon =

Art and lace museum in Alençon, France

Musée des Beaux-arts et de la Dentelle d'Alençon
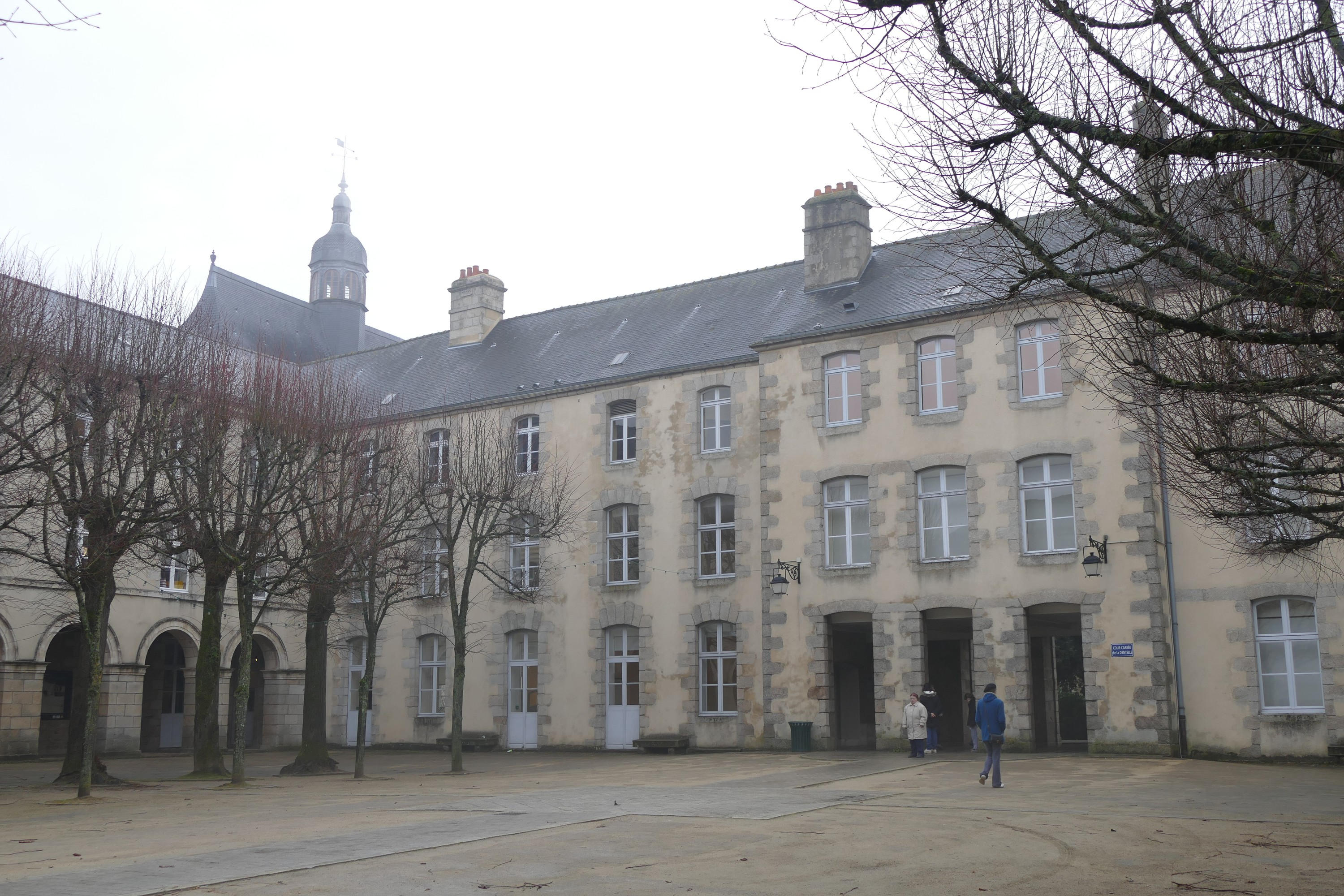
- Established: 1857
- Location: Alençon, Orne, France
- Coordinates: 48°25′52″N 0°05′00″E
- Type: Fine art, lace
- Website: paysdalencontourisme.fr

The Musée des Beaux-Arts et de la Dentelle d'Alençon (the Museum of Fine Arts and Lace of Alençon) is an art museum located in Alençon, France.

The museum has been open since 1981.

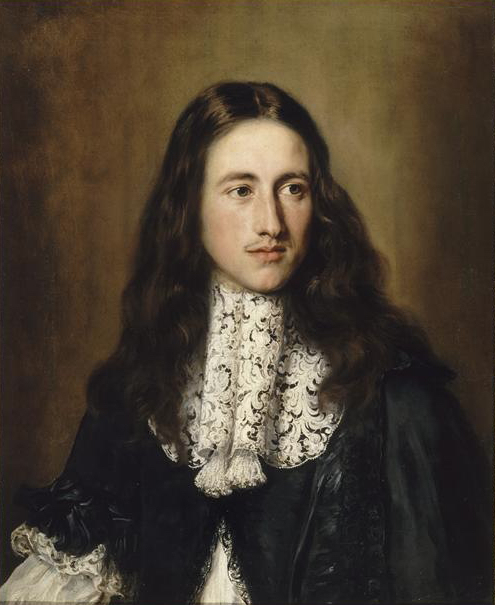
Portrait of a Young Man of the Chigi Family by Jacob Ferdinand Voet

== See also ==
- List of Jesuit sites
