= Hard cast =

Hard cast may refer to:

- a hard lead alloy intended to reduce fouling of rifling grooves, used as bullet material
- Orthopedic cast, a shell that encases a limb
- Metal casting, a process in which a liquid metal is delivered into a mold of the intended shape

== See also ==
- Cast (disambiguation)
