= Henry Katumba Tamale =

Ugandan Anglican bishop

The Right Reverend Henry Katumba Tamale
- Bishop of West Buganda
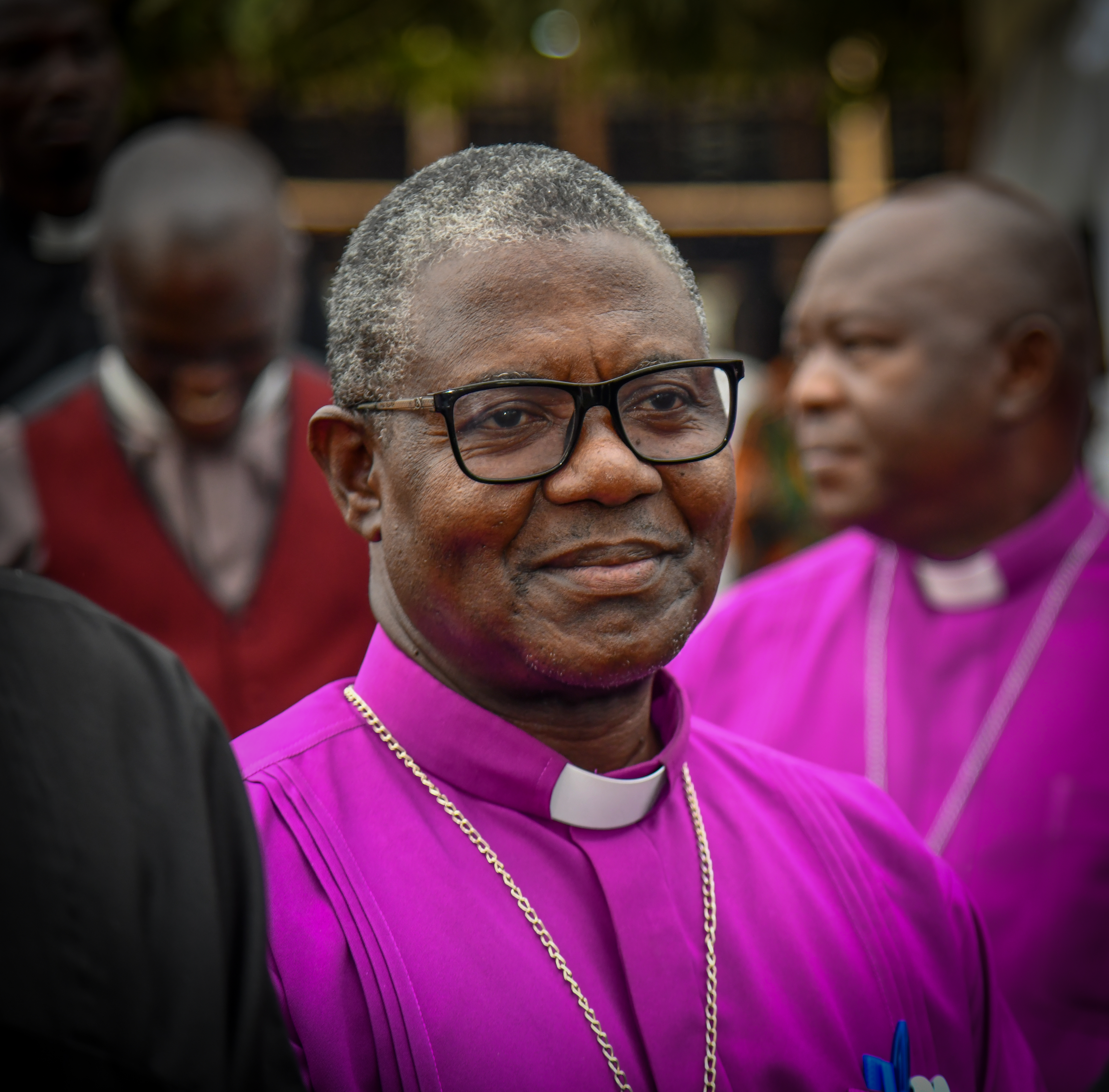
- Bishop Henry Katumba Tamale, the Bishop of West Buganda Diocese
- Church: Church of Uganda
- Diocese: West Buganda
- In office: 2016 – 30 March 2025
- Retired: 30 March 2025
- Predecessor: Godfrey Makumbi
- Successor: Gaster Nsereko

Orders
- Ordination: 1985
- Consecration: 28 August 2016

Personal details
- Born: March 28, 1960 (age 66)
- Denomination: Anglican Christian
- Residence: Shalom Villa, Nyendo-Mukungwe Division, Masaka City (Uganda)
- Spouse: The Rev. Elizabeth Julia Katumba Tamale

Henry Katumba Tamale (born March 28, 1960) is a Ugandan Anglican Bishop.

In the 1980s, Henry began his active participation in the Church of Uganda, which led him to be ordained as a priest in 1985. He married the Rev. Elizabeth Julia Katumba Tamale on December 12, 1987, at Namirembe Cathedral, Uganda. They have five children.

Henry is the sixth Bishop of West Buganda Diocese in the Church of Uganda. he was consecrated and took office on 28 August 2016. He was previously a priest and assistant to the Bishop of Namirembe. In 2017, Bishop Tamale said the lack of good roads in Buganda made travel hard. Bishop Henry Katumba Tamale retired on March 29, 2025 and was succeeded by the Right Rev. Gaster Nsereko as the 7th Bishop of West Buganda Diocese who was consecrated and enthroned on March 30, 2025.
