= Casting (disambiguation) =

Casting is a manufacturing process using a fluid medium in a mould, so as to produce a casting. For casting metal, see casting (metalworking).

Casting may also refer to:

== Creating a mold ==
- Casting, forming a protective orthopedic cast
- Casting, a process in sculpture of converting plastic materials into more solid form

== Science and healthcare ==
- Casting (falconry), anything given to a hawk to purge and cleanse its gorge
- Casting, excretions from an earthworm
- Casting, moulting or shedding of hair in most breeds of dog and other mammals
- Casting, forming a protective orthopedic cast

== Other uses ==
- Casting (fishing), the process of propelling a lure to catch fish
- Casting (performing arts), the process of selecting a cast of actors, or other visual talent such as models for a photo shoot
- Casting or footing, in bookkeeping, a method of summing a table of numbers by column
- Casting, to distribute a stream of data, images, sound, or voice, as in
  - Broadcasting
  - Podcasting
  - Webcasting
- Screen mirroring:
  - Miracast
  - Google Cast
  - AirPlay
- Casting, incantation of magical spells
- Casting, type conversion in computer programming
- Castings plc, British metal-casting company

== See also ==
- Cast (disambiguation)
- Castang (disambiguation)
- Castaing, a surname
- Caster (disambiguation)
- Recast (disambiguation)
