= Mannatech =

Multinational multi-level marketing company

Mannatech Inc.

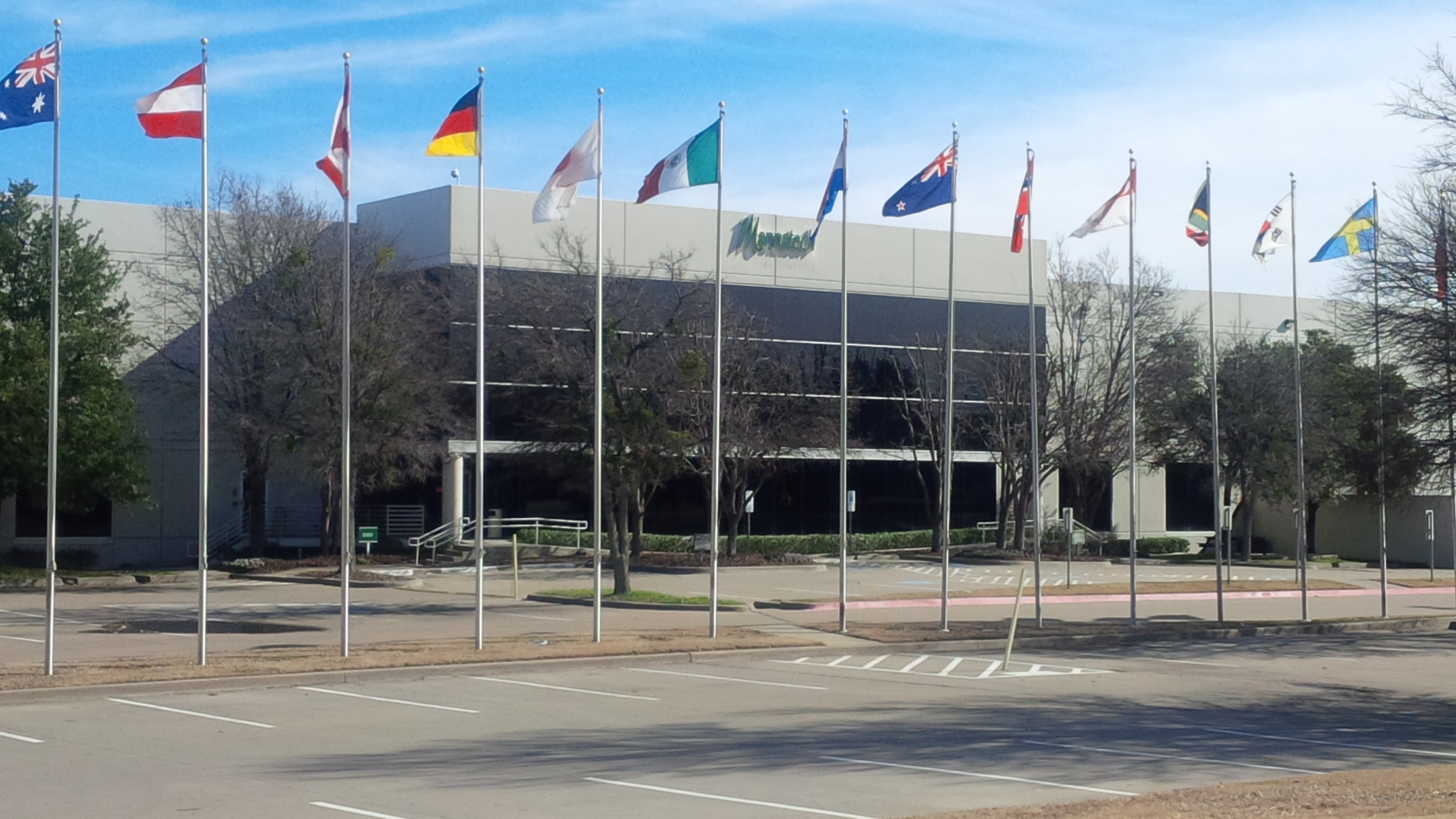
- Mannatech headquarters in Flower Mound, Texas
- Type: Public
- Traded as: Nasdaq: MTEX
- Industry: Dietary supplements; Personal care; Multi-level marketing
- Founded: November 4, 1993 in Coppell, Texas, U.S.
- Founder: Samuel Caster
- Headquarters: Flower Mound, Texas, U.S.
- Key people: Landen Fredrick (CEO and president); J. Stanley Fredrick (chairman)
- Revenue: ▼US$ 176.696 million (2017)
- Operating income: ▲US$ 2.519 thousand (2017)
- Net income: ▼US$ -1.787 million (2017)
- Total assets: ▲US$ 76.242 million (2017)
- Total equity: ▲US$ 40.241 million (2017)
- Number of employees: 252 (Dec 2017)
- Website: mannatech.com

Mannatech Inc. is a publicly traded, multinational multi-level marketing firm that sells dietary supplements and personal care products. It was founded in November 1993 by Samuel Caster, and is headquartered in Flower Mound, Texas. The company's stock is traded on the NASDAQ exchange under the symbol MTEX. As of 2017, Mannatech employed 252 people and sold its products through some 220,000 independent sales associates.

In 2007, Mannatech and its salespeople made false claims of anti-disease benefits about its lead product called "Ambrotose" which contains sugars derived from plants. The company was profitable soon after its founding until about 2008, when it started losing money due to exposure of its business practices through a class action lawsuit based on the false health claims, a critical 20/20 news special, and a civil suit filed by the Attorney General of Texas.

== History ==
Mannatech was founded by Samuel Caster in 1993, as Congress prepared to pass the Dietary Supplement Health and Education Act of 1994, which made feasible the profitable marketing of a wider spectrum of dietary supplements. The company has had a Christian orientation since its founding; the name was intended to evoke manna, and it recruited people to sell its products through its multi-level marketing structure in church congregations. Prior to founding Mannatech, Caster had founded and run Eagle Shield, an insulation manufacturer, and Electracat, a pest control device; both were categorized as a hoax by the Texas Attorney General's office.

Mannatech was founded to sell dietary supplements and personal care products. Before developing its own products, the company sold Manapol, an aloe vera extract made by another company. Its most widely known product has been Ambrotose, a dietary supplement made from sugars derived from plants.

From 1993 to 2009, Rafael Cruz, father of presidential candidate Ted Cruz, was a top salesman for Mannatech.

Mannatech had its initial public offering (IPO) on February 16, 1999, at $8 a share. The stock price settled a few weeks later at a price of $15.13 a share and a market capitalization of $366 million. The IPO raised $12 million in funds to be used for expansion into Australia and the U.K.

=== False claims and lawsuits ===
The company came to be known for unproven claims that its products could be used to treat many diseases and conditions, including cancer, diabetes, autism and AIDS. There is no evidence that any of these claims were or are true.

In May 2005 an article was published in Barron's questioning the company's business practices. In September 2005, a class-action lawsuit was filed against Mannatech for alleged violations of the Securities Exchange Act; it was prompted by the Barron's article.

In 2006, Mannatech distributor Vivienne Balonwu, a U.K. general practitioner, was found by the U.K. General Medical Council panel to have "abused her power as a doctor" after it was determined that she had illegally promoted and sold the company's products to people as a treatment for medical conditions such as chronic obstructive pulmonary disease and stroke-related complications. Following patient complaints about her marketing of the products in 2006, Balonwu was dismissed by her employer, Harmoni, a medical services company, and the GMC panel imposed a 15-month penalty period during which she was "to avoid private or short term locum work" and "to complete a supervised personal development plan to tackle shortcomings in her practice".

Also in 2006, Mannatech was named #5 on Forbes’ list of America's 200 Best Small Companies. At the same time, the company came under investigation by the Texas Attorney General in October 2006 for alleged violations of that state's Deceptive Trade Practices Act. In July 2006, Texas Attorney General Greg Abbott formally charged Mannatech, MannaRelief, Sam Caster, and Reginald McDaniel, the company's medical director, with operating an illegal marketing scheme in violation of state law.

A 20/20 undercover investigation that aired June 1, 2007 on ABC Television showed Mannatech's sales associates teaching sales recruits how to target Mannatech products to people with specific illnesses in a manner that purportedly does not violate U.S. federal law, including U.S. Food and Drug Administration regulations, by avoiding direct claims that the products cure any particular diseases.

In August 2007, Caster resigned as CEO of Mannatech. In October 2007, it was reported that the company had fired Grant Thornton LLP as its auditor after the accounting firm demanded that Mannatech remove Caster from all responsibilities to be replaced by Wayne Badovinus as the new chief executive. Several corporate initiatives were undertaken, but after 17 months on the job Badovinus resigned in December 2009. Another member of the board resigned shortly after. Mannatech's Chief Science Officer Robert Sinnott and Mannatech's chief financial officer Steve Fenstermacher were named Co-CEOs. Fenstermacher later resigned.

Publicity over the company's lawsuits began to damage the balance sheets and stock performance. After profits of $32 million in 2006 and $6.6 million in 2007, Mannatech reported a $12.6 million loss in 2008 and a $17.3 million loss in 2009.

Mannatech settled the civil complaint with the State of Texas in February 2009; Mannatech did not admit wrongdoing but agreed to pay $4 million in restitution to clients who purchased products and $2 million to the state to cover its costs in the case. In addition, Sam Caster agreed to pay a $1 million civil penalty and steer clear of any type of leadership position or employment relationship with Mannatech for five years.

In March 2008, Mannatech settled the class-action lawsuit by agreeing to pay $11.25 million to the plaintiff class. As part of the settlement, Mannatech admitted no wrongdoing.

2010 losses were $10.6 million. As the company's market capitalizations continued to fall, S&P Indices dropped it from the S&P 600 Index, stating "They are no longer representative of the small cap market space." Recruiting efforts continued dropping in 2011, widening company losses to $20.6 million. For 2012, the company's net loss narrowed to around $1 million from the about $21 million loss the year before. In 2013, it had around $3 million in net income, and in 2014, it reported profits of $6.5 million and total revenue of $190.1 million.

In November 2017, Mannatech received an FDA warning letter for illegally marketing several of its supplement products as medicinal agents and for selling adulterated and misbranded products in violation of Title 21 of the Code of Federal Regulations and Good Manufacturing Practice regulations for dietary supplements. In December 2017, Mannatech reached an agreement with the Town Council of Flower Mound, Texas, to relocate its headquarters to an existing facility in the city.

=== Ben Carson ===
Starting in 2004, neurosurgeon and conservative politician Ben Carson made videos and spoke at company events promoting Mannatech and its products. In 2004, in a speech at a Mannatech event, he credited the company's products with the disappearance of his cancer symptoms.

Carson's image still appeared on the Mannatech's website in 2014, and in the same year he praised their "glyconutrient" supplements in a PBS special (The Missing Link – The Science of Brain Health), sponsored by a group of Mannatech distributors, that was subsequently featured on the site. During the CNBC GOP debate on October 28, 2015, Carson was asked about his relationship with Mannatech and denied any involvement with the company. Politifact rated Carson's denial of any involvement as "false". In November 2015, Mannatech said on its website that, for compliance with Federal campaign finance regulations, the company had removed all references to Carson before he announced his bid for the presidency.

== See also ==
- List of ineffective cancer treatments
