= Cast =

Cast may refer to:

== Education ==
- Cambridge Academy for Science and Technology

== Music ==
- Cast (British band), an English alternative rock band
- Cast (Mexican band), a progressive Mexican rock band
- The Cast, a Scottish musical duo: Mairi Campbell and Dave Francis
- Cast, a 2012 album by Trespassers William
- Cast, a 2018 album by KAT-TUN

== Science and technology ==
- Casting (metalworking)
  - Cast iron, a group of iron-carbon alloys
- Cast (geology), a cavity formed by decomposition that once were covered by a casing material
- Cast, visible piles of mineral-rich organic matter excreted above ground by earthworms
- Cast of the eye, a condition in which the eyes do not properly align with each other when looking at an object
- Orthopedic cast, a protective shell to hold a limb in place, for example to help in healing broken bones
- Cast (computer science), to change the interpretation of a bit pattern from one data type to another in computer programming
- Urinary cast, tubules found in urine
- Google Cast, a protocol built into the Google Chromecast and other embedded technologies
- Game cast of a video game

== Sports ==
- Cast (archery), the distance a bow can shoot its arrow
- Cast, in falconry, to fly two or more falconry birds together
- Cast, in fishing, to cast a line refers to the act of throwing bait or a lure using a fishing line out over the water using a flexible fishing rod

== Other uses ==
- Cast member, one of the performers in a play, movie, or other performing art form
- Cast, the casting of a magic spell
- Don cast, an Indonesia talk show on Nusantara TV
- Plaster cast, a copy made in plaster of another three-dimensional form, such as a sculpture
- Cast, Finistère, a commune of the Finistère département, France
- Cast, a theatre venue in Doncaster, UK

== People with the name ==
- Alice Cast (born 1900), British sprinter
- Kristin Cast (born 1986), coauthor of the House of Night series with her mother P.C. Cast
- P. C. Cast (born 1960), American romance/fantasy coauthor of the House of Night series with her daughter Kristin Cast

== See also ==
- CAST (disambiguation)
- Caste (disambiguation)
- Casting (disambiguation)
- Hard cast (disambiguation)
- The die is cast (Latin: Alea iacta est)
- "The Die Is Cast" (Star Trek: Deep Space Nine), an episode of Star Trek: Deep Space Nine
