= Withdrawal =

Withdrawal means "an act of taking out" and may refer to:

- Anchoresis (withdrawal from the world for religious or ethical reasons)
- Coitus interruptus (the withdrawal method)
- Drug withdrawal
- Social withdrawal
- Taking of money from a bank
- Water withdrawal
- Withdrawal (military)
- Withdrawal reflex
- Withdrawal, Twista/Do or Die EP
- "Withdrawals" (Tyler Farr song)
- Withdrawals (OsamaSon and Nettspend song)
