= Tokebi =

Guatemalan artist, illustrator and professor

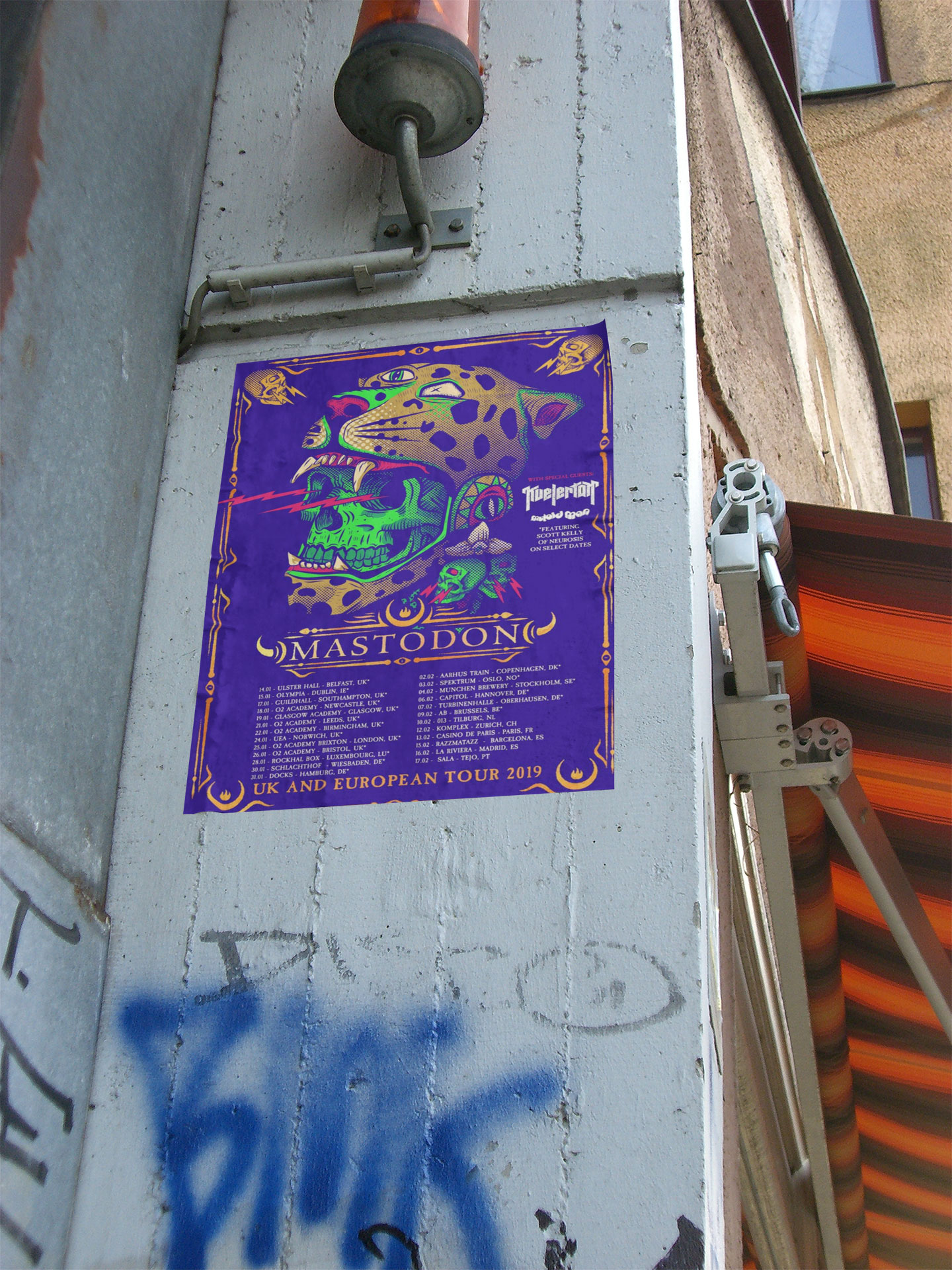
- Tokebi design used by heavy metal band Mastodon
- Born: Bernal Aguilar; 1981 (age 44–45); Guatemala
- Years active: 2010–present
- Known for: Psychedelic skull illustrations, Album artwork for international bands (e.g., Mastodon), Lowbrow art movement, NFT digital art
- Movement: Lowbrow
- Website: www.tokebi.net

Bernal Aguilar (born 1981), also known as Tokebi (stylized as TOKEBI) is a Guatemalan digital artist, illustrator, and university professor, best known for incorporating skulls, bright neon colors, and a kitsch aesthetic into his work. Tokebi gained recognition when the Grammy-winning heavy metal band Mastodon personally selected him to design their merchandise for the 2019 European Tour. Tokebi is especially popular among rock bands, rappers and DJs, and is seen as one of the international ambassadors of the Guatemalan lowbrow movement.

== Career ==
Tokebi's artistic career began in 2010 on the streets of Hongdae, Seoul, where he sold his pieces on prints and t-shirts, gaining recognition in local media for thriving as a foreigner. He adopted the name Tokebi while living in South Korea, inspired by the dokkaebi (goblins) of Korean mythology, mischievous figures who reward good people and trick the wicked. In 2014, Tokebi with a group of local and international artists founded and participated in several artistic collective exhibitions with the aim of uniting international and Korean artists called Nothing Serious I and Nothing Serious II respectively, in Seoul, South Korea. However, most of his work is related to the music industry, especially in the indie, rock, hip hop and electronic music scene, working with bands like Grammy winner Mastodon, Calcium, and local bands in United States, Australia, Europe, among others. Tokebi is currently a professor at Universidad del Istmo in Guatemala, and his artistic career expanded into the world of non-fungible assets (NFTs), becoming the first artist in Guatemala to launch an NFT while being supported by Polygon blockchain. In 2022, the Ministry of Culture and Sports of Guatemala enlisted Tokebi in the National Artist Registry.
