= Gaster (surname) =

Gaster is a German surname. The Dictionary of American Family Names suggests that it may be a derivation from Gast "guest".

There were 918 entries in the US white pages for this name as of 2013, the largest number (221 entries) in North Carolina. In Germany, there were 95 entries as of 2008.

Notable people with the surname include:

- Jack Gaster (1907–2007), British communist solicitor and politician, son of Moses
- W.D. Gaster (created 2015), a fictional character created by Toby Fox
- Jean-Paul Gaster (born 1971), American drummer
- Michael Gaster, British aerospace engineer
- Moses Gaster (1856–1939), Romanian-born British rabbi and scholar
- Theodor Gaster (1906–1992), British-born American Biblical scholar, son of Moses
