= Architecture contemporaine remarquable =

French heritage designation

Architecture contemporaine remarquable logo

Architecture contemporaine remarquable (ACR) is an official French label created in 2016 by the Ministry of Culture to be awarded to architectural and urban developments built no more than 100 years at the date of the certification, and considered remarkable from the aesthetic and technical point of view. Buildings already protected under historical monuments cannot be affected by the measure.

Created in 2016, stemming from the law on the freedom of creation, architecture and heritage (LCAP law) and coming into force under a decree of March 28, 2017, this label replaces that of "Heritage of the twentieth century", established in 1999 to enhance the architectural heritage built in the course of the 20th century. It automatically applies to all buildings previously honored with the "20th century heritage" label and built for less than 100 years; the label is automatically removed after the centenary of construction.
