= Edme Castaing =

French murderer and physician

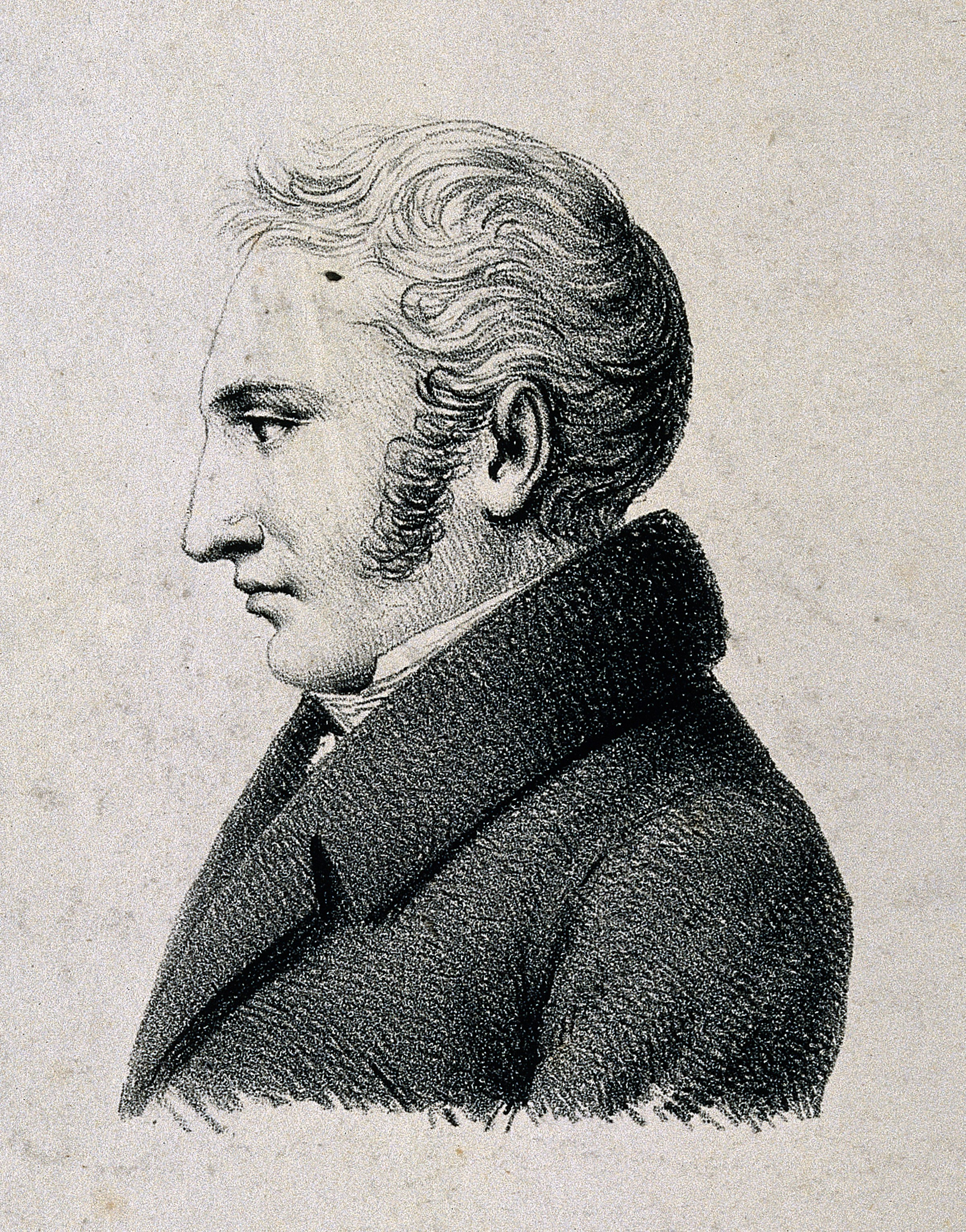
- A lithograph of Castaing
- Born: 1796; Alençon, France
- Died: 6 December 1823 (aged 26–27)
- Citizenship: France
- Education: Paris Medical Faculty
- Occupations: Physician; murderer
- Known for: Using morphine to commit murder

Edme-Samuel Castaing (1796 – 6 December 1823) was a French medical doctor and is thought to have been the first person to use morphine to commit murder.

== Early life ==
Castaing was born in Alençon, France, the youngest of the three sons of an inspector-general in the department of Woods and Forests. He went to school in Angers, where he was an outstanding student, winning many prizes. He graduated from the School of Medicine in Paris, becoming a doctor in 1821, by which time he had fathered two children with his mistress, the widow of a judge. He was under financial pressure, which became further exacerbated by a friend's debt of 600 francs, for which he had vouched in 1818 and which became due in 1820.

== Murders and fraud ==
He befriended two wealthy lawyer brothers, Hippolyte and Auguste Ballet. In October 1822 Hippolyte died from a sudden illness, leaving 260,000 francs to be split between his brother Auguste and their sister. Castaing, who had been treating Hippolyte, and another doctor conducted the autopsy, concluding that he had died of pleurisy aggravated by consumption. On September 18, it was later shown in court, Castaing had purchased 10 grains of acetate of morphia.

Two days later on October 7, Auguste cashed 100,000 francs of stocks, which he was later seen giving to Castaing. Auguste would later claim that this was to be used as a bribe to get the family lawyer, Lebret, to destroy a will by Hippolyte that favoured the brothers' sister. On October 10 though, Castaing gave a stockbroker 66,000 francs to invest, then on the 11th he sent his mother 30,000 francs and on the 14th gave his mistress 4,000 francs.

On December 1, 1822, Auguste made out a will with Castaing as sole legatee. It was deposited with Castaing's cousin, a notary's clerk, on May 29, 1823. That same day, Castaing and Auguste went on holiday to the countryside near Saint Germain and spent the next day back in Paris in Saint-Cloud, where Auguste fell ill. Castaing had that day purchased 36 grains of morphia. The next day, on June 1, Auguste died. The following day Castaing was arrested and a post-mortem was held. Though it deemed Auguste to have died from natural causes, Castaing was not released.

== Arrest and trial ==
Castaing was taken to Paris, where an investigation commenced that lasted five months. For the first three days Castaing feigned insanity but soon gave it up. He was then moved to Versailles prison.

His trial commenced before the Paris Assize Court on November 10, 1823, and lasted eight days. He was charged with the murder of Hippolyte Ballet, the destruction of a document containing the final dispositions of Hippolyte's property, and with the murder of Auguste Ballet. The three charges were to be tried simultaneously. The acte d'accusation (indictment) against Castaing consisted of a hundred closely printed pages.

Castaing was defended by two advocates: Roussel, a schoolfellow of his, and the famous Pierre-Antoine Berryer, though the latter's speech is not considered one of his most successful ones. According to Irving, Berryer "gave personal testimony as to the taste of acetate of morphia. He said that with the help of his own chemist he had put a quarter of a grain of the acetate into a large spoonful of milk, and had found it so insupportably bitter to the taste that he could not keep it in his mouth."

Much hinged on the lack of morphia in the bodies of the deceased. In his concluding address, Berryer "quoted the words addressed by one of the Kings of France to his judges: "When God has not vouchsafed clear proof of a crime, it is a sign that He does not wish that man should determine it, but leaves its judgment to a higher tribunal."'

Medical opinions differed as to the nature of the poison used in the murders. The jury took two hours to decide the verdict. They found Castaing innocent of the murder of Hippolyte but guilty of destroying his will and guilty by seven votes to five of the murder of Auguste.

Castaing, in a last statement before being sentenced said:

I shall know how to die, though I am the victim of ill-fortune, of fatal circumstance. I shall go to meet my two friends. I am accused of having treacherously murdered them. There is a Providence above us! If there is such a thing as an immortal soul, I shall see Hippolyte and Auguste Ballet again. This is no empty declamation; I don't ask for human pity. I look to God's mercy, and shall go joyfully to the scaffold. My conscience is clear.

== Execution ==
After a failed appeal and a suicide attempt (using poison hidden inside a watch, which was brought to him in prison by a friend), he was executed on December 6, 1823.

In the Alexandre Dumas novel The Count of Monte Cristo, Albert de Morcerf tells Franz d'Epinay and the Count that he witnessed the execution of Castaing.

== See also ==
- John Bodkin Adams – doctor suspected of murdering his patients with morphine
- Harold Shipman – doctor convicted of murdering his patients with morphine
- List of serial killers before 1900
