= Samuel Caster =

American businessman

Samuel Caster is an American businessman who founded Mannatech, a multi-level marketing firm located in Coppell, Texas. Prior to founding Mannatech, Caster had founded and run Eagle Shield and marketed Electracat, a pest control device declared by the Attorney General of Texas as a hoax. He now runs Alovea and Manna-Relief.

== Early life ==
Caster attended North Texas State University (now University of North Texas) for a four-month period in 1972.

== Career ==
In the late 1980s, Caster founded Eagle Shield, which sold an insulation product that it claimed was based on new technology developed by NASA and that could reduce heating and cooling costs by up to 40%. In May 1988, the Attorney General of Texas concluded that the product's technology long predated NASA and did not reduce consumers' bills in the amounts advertised. Caster agreed to stop making statements about Eagle Shield.

Caster's second product, the Electracat, was sold as a pest control device. The Electracat reportedly emitted pulsed vibrations that repelled rats, crickets, snakes, ticks, spiders, mosquitoes, and scorpions. However, in January 1991, the Attorney General of Texas investigated the product and found that the Electracat emitted no vibrations whatsoever. The Attorney General declared, "The device is a hoax, and stands on the same scientific footing as a perpetual motion machine." Caster agreed to stop selling the Electracat and "to refrain from making claims about products that were not supported by science".

In 1993, Caster founded Mannatech. He served as CEO of the company until August 2007, when he resigned. In October 2007, it was reported that the company had fired Grant Thornton LLP as its auditor after the accounting firm demanded that Mannatech remove Caster from all responsibilities. Greg Abbott, the then-Texas Attorney General, charged Caster and Mannatech "with operating an illegal marketing scheme." Caster settled the lawsuit in 2009 and agreed to personally pay $1 million in addition to the penalties exacted from Mannatech.
