= Charles Éléonor Dufriche-Valazé =

French jurist, lawyer, and politician

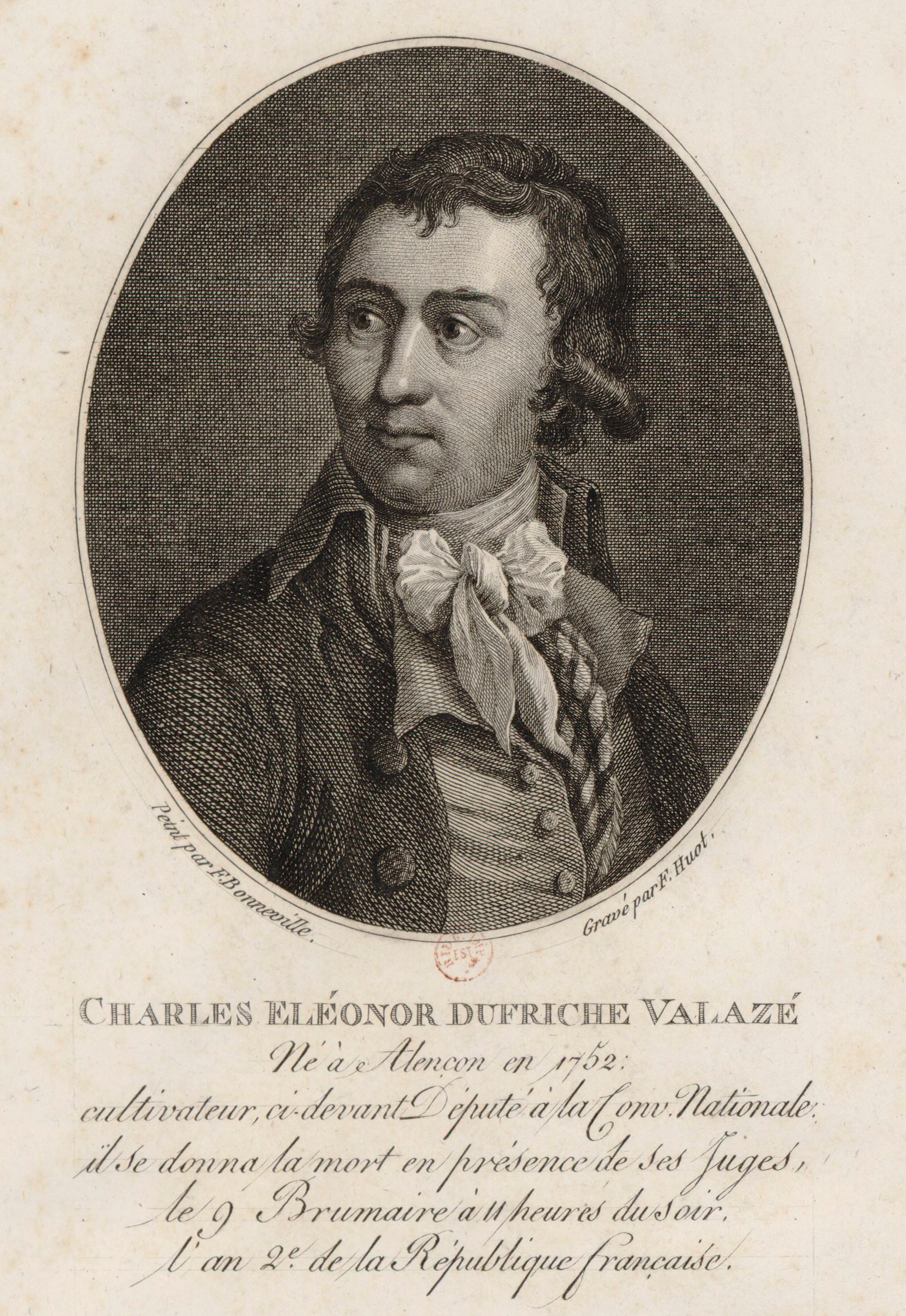
- Print of Dufriche-Valazé
- Born: 23 January 1751; Alençon
- Died: October 30, 1793 (aged 42); Paris
- Occupations: politician and Lawyer

Charles Éléonor Dufriche de Valazé (23 January 1751 - 30 October 1793) was a French jurist, lawyer, and politician of the French Revolution.

== Biography ==
Charles Eléonor Dufriche de Valazé was born on the 23rd of January, 1751 to Françoise Le Sergeant & and Nicolas Dufriche, a holder of a presidial seat in the Generality of Alençon. Dufriche-Valazé was briefly an officer in the French Royal Army and then became a lawyer. By 1789, he was the administrator of the district of Alençon. In 1790 he became the first Mayor of Essay. As the revolution progressed, he was recognized by the Jacobins for his increasingly anti-monarchical remarks. After the formation of the National Convention, he was elected as a member of parliament for the departement of Orne. He was aligned with the Girondins and voted for the abolition of the monarchy. He also participated in the initial attacks on the Commune of Paris.

== Trial of Louis XVI and aftermath ==
During the trial of Louis XVI, Dufriche-Valazé was appointed to the "Commission of the Twenty-One" , the committee responsible for the presentation of all charges against the deposed king and all questions asked during the proceedings. The verdict of the trial resulted in the Convention finding the Louis XVI guilty and resulted in his execution on the 21st of January.

In the wake of Louis XVI's execution, the French Republic found itself at war with The Holy Roman Empire, Prussia, The Netherlands, Spain, Portugal, Naples, the Papal States, the United Kingdom and French Royalists. In the midst these conflicts, Dufriche-Valazé politically targeted his revolutionary rival Marat, resulting in his denouncement in L'Ami du peuple and the severe degradation of his reputation among Parisians and the sans-culottes. On the 2nd of June, 1793, the National Guard apprehended Dufriche-Valazé along with several prominent Girondins; he was tried by a revolutionary court on the 30th of October and after the declaration of a guilty verdict, he produced a concealed stylet and pierced his own heart, resulting in his death.

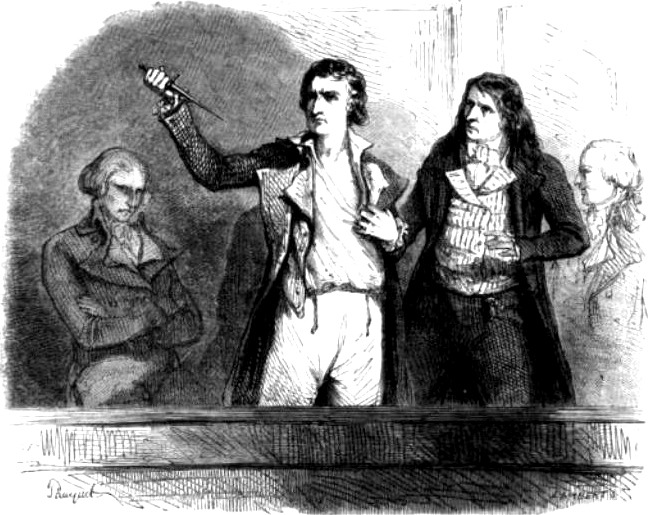
19th Century engraving of Dufriche-Valazé's suicide
