= Jean Castaing (playwright) =

French poet, playwright and printer

- Born: 1723; Paris, France
- Died: March 1805 (aged 81–82); Alençon, France
- Occupations: Poet; playwright; printer

Jean Castaing (1723 in Paris – March 1805 in Alençon) was an 18th-century French poet, playwright and printer.

== Biography ==
Both an author, typographer, or bookbinder, Castaing who by profession was collector of the taille in his hometown, is the author of several plays printed by himself in his print shop. This collection, whose plays have been described as "as bad as misprinted", has no other merit than its rarity. The author says ingenuously in his preface that by printing 30 copies of his theater, "he had no other purpose than to distract himself, without the annoyance to bother over thirty people". According to the same preface, it seems that this theater was to consist of four volumes, unless one counts for the fourth volume la Femme curieuse, printed in 1793, and which is part of Volume III. Because of this, his poetry and theater are extremely rare. The local historian Léon de La Sicotière had his complete theatrical and poetic productions, printed to a very small number of copies in his rich library. Several of Castaing's plays have been performed on the stage of Alencon.

Founder of the Alençonnaise Masonic lodge ("Saint-Louis-des-Cœurs-Zélés"), in 1752, he represented the masonry from Orne at the creation of the Grand Orient de France in 1773.

== Works ==
- Vaudevilles et Chansons du Bouquet des Moissonneurs, divertissement-mascarade, Alençon, 1783, in-8°.
- Recueil de pièces de théâtre, Alençon, 1791-2, 3 vol. in-8°.
- The Bibliothèque dramatique by Martineau de Soleinne (1844) contains the most complete list of drama works by Jean Castaing, that is:
  - Apologie de ma solitude
  - Prologue et scènes allégoriques
  - Le Philosophe soi-disant
  - Prologue de Lise
  - Lise, ou le triomphe de la reconnaissance
  - La Fête du village
  - l'Avant-Soupé
  - Le Véritable ami
  - Le Misanthrope corrigé
  - Tout ou Rien
  - Paméla
  - Paméla mariée
  - La Femme curieuse, ou les Francs-Maçons
- Autres créations littéraires de Jean Castaing conservées à la BNF :
  - Opuscules d'un amateur, imprimé par lui-même.Tome premier (1785)
  - Opuscules de J.Castaing, revus, corrigés et augmentés, imprimés par lui-même, 2e édition.- Distiques et pensées morales et philosophiques, imprimés par lui-même. 2e édition (1790)
  - Fugitives de J.Castaing, imprimées par lui-même (1794)

== Sources ==
- Jacques-Charles Brunet, Manuel du libraire et de l’amateur de livres, t.1, Paris, Silvestre, (p. 569).
- Théodore-Éloi Lebreton, Biographie normande, t. 1, Rouen, Le Brument, 1865, (p. 385).
- Joseph-Marie Quérard, La France littéraire, ou Dictionnaire bibliographique des savants, t.2, Paris, Firmin-Didot, 1828, (p. 72)
- Bulletin de la société historique et archéologique de l’Orne, t. III, Alençon, Renaut-De Broise, (p. 410–1).
- L’Intermédiaire des chercheurs et curieux, t.7, Paris, Sandoz et Fischbacher, 1874, (p. 412).
- Revue de l'exposition maçonnique 2003 du Musée des beaux-arts et de la dentelle under the direction of Éric Saunier, (p. 10)
- Bibliothèque dramatique de Monsieur Alexandre Martineau de Soleinne. Catalogue rédigé par P. L. Jacob, bibliophile. Paris, Alliance des Arts, 1843-1845, 6 vol.
