= CAST tool =

Software testing tool

CAST tools
- Developer: Various vendors
- Operating system: Cross-platform
- Type: Software testing, Test management, Multimedia development
- License: Proprietary / Commercial

CAST tools are software applications used in the process of software testing. The acronym stands for "Computer Aided Software Testing". Such tools are available from various vendors and there are different tools for different types of testing, as well as for test management. They are known to be cost-effective and time-saving because they reduce the incidence of human error and are thorough.

CAST is also a multimedia professional development tool or multimedia database.
