= Gaster Nsereko =

Ugandan Anglican bishop (born 1965)

The Right Reverend Gaster Nsereko
- Bishop of West Uganda
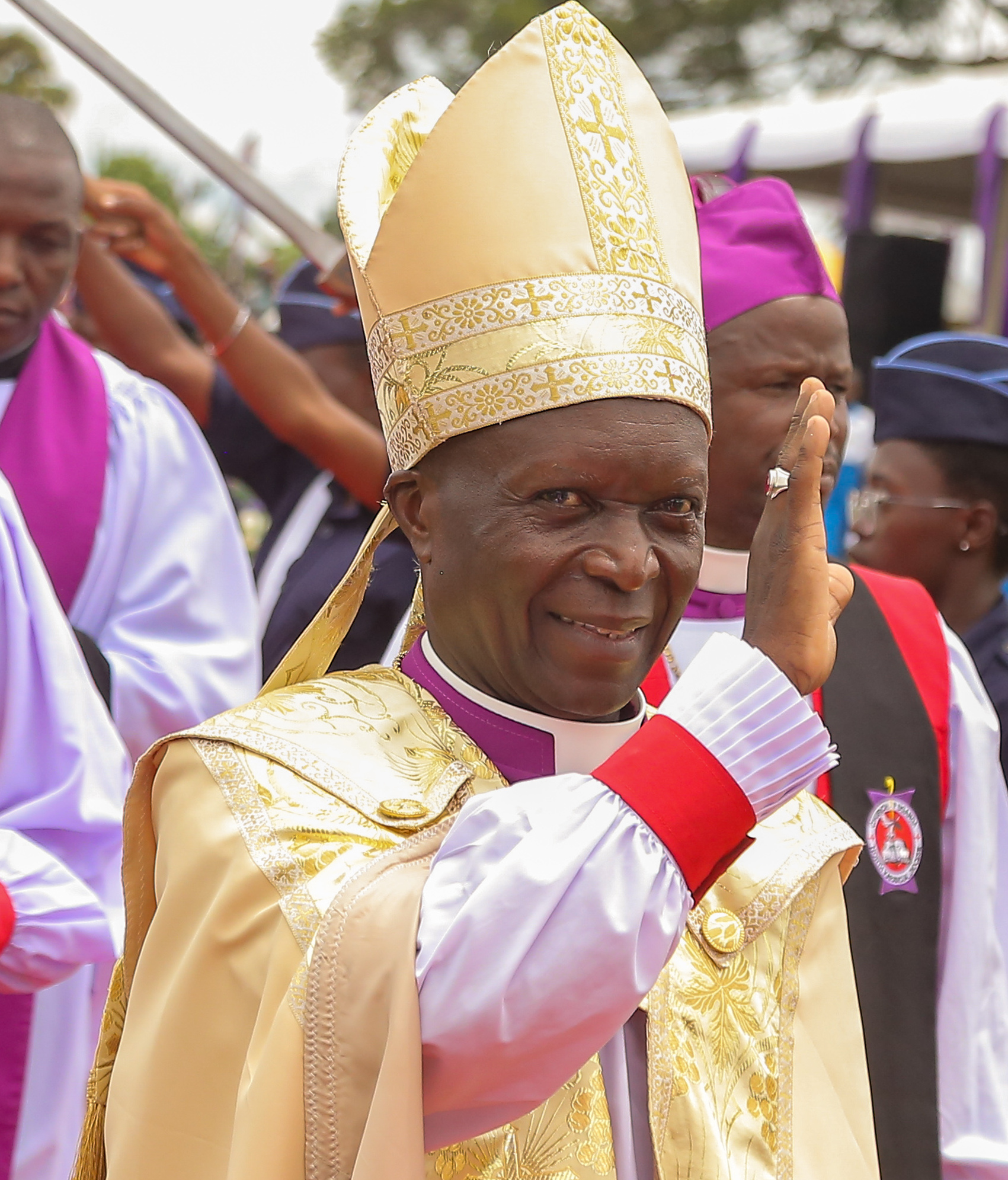
- Gaster Nsereko at his consecration and enthronement in 2025.
- Church: Church of Uganda
- Diocese: West Buganda
- Installed: 30 March 2025
- Predecessor: Henry Katumba Tamale

Orders
- Ordination: 1989
- Consecration: 30 March 2025

Personal details
- Born: July 5, 1965 (age 61)
- Denomination: Anglican Christian
- Spouse: Sarah Nsereko

Gaster Nsereko (born 5 July 1965) is a Anglican Bishop in Uganda. He is the 7th and current Bishop of the Diocese of West Uganda. He was consecrated and enthroned on 30 March 2025 at St Paul's Cathedral, Kako.

== Early life and education ==
Nsereko was born on 5 July 1965 in Bbira Naakuwadde, Busiro, in the Wakiso District of Uganda.

He holds a Diploma in Primary Education from the Institute of Teacher Education Kyambogo (now Kyambogo University) and a Bachelor of Divinity from Uganda Christian University (UCU).

== Priesthood ==
Nsereko began his ministry in the late 1980s. He was ordained a deacon on 9 December 1989 and a priest one year later, on 10 December 1990, at St. Andrew's Cathedral in Namukozi.

Over the course of his career, he served in various capacities within the church hierarchy, including:

- Vicar of St. John's Church, Kakoma.
- Archdeacon of Kakoma Archdeaconry.
- Archdeacon of Masaka Archdeaconry (seated at St. John's Church, Kijjabwemi).
- Provost of St Paul's Cathedral, Kako.

He was made a Canon on 17 January 2010 at St. Paul's Cathedral, Kako.

== Episcopacy ==
On 16 February 2025, the House of Bishops of the Church of Uganda, elected Nsereko as the 7th Bishop of West Buganda Diocese. He was elected to succeed the Rt. Rev. Henry Katumba Tamale, who had reached the mandatory retirement age of 65.

Nsereko was consecrated and enthroned on 30 March 2025 by the Archbishop of the Church of Uganda, Stephen Kaziimba Mugalu. The ceremony took place at the diocesan headquarters, St. Paul's Cathedral, Kako, in Masaka City.

At the time of his election, Nsereko was 60 years old, meaning he is expected to serve a five-year term before reaching the Church of Uganda's mandatory retirement age.

== Personal life ==
Nsereko is married to Sarah Nsereko. Together they have three children.
