= Godfrey Makumbi =

- Bishop of West Buganda
- Church: Anglican Church of Uganda
- Diocese: West Buganda
- Appointed: 23 January 2011
- Term ended: 31 May 2015
- Predecessor: Samuel Keefa Kamya Ssemakula

Orders
- Consecration: 23 January 2011

Personal details
- Born: 15 December 1962 Nansana, Kyaddondo, Wakiso District, Uganda
- Died: 31 May 2015 (aged 52)
- Denomination: Anglican
- Spouse: Deborah Makumbi
- Children: 4
- Education: Makerere University; University of Southampton

Godfrey Makumbi (15 December 1962 – 31 May 2015) was an Anglican bishop in Uganda. He served as Bishop of West Buganda from 2011 until his death in May 2015.

== Early life and education ==
Makumbi was born on 15 December 1962 in Nansana, Kyaddondo Wakiso District. He attended primary and secondary school locally before pursuing higher education. He studied at Makerere University, where he completed a diploma in Education and later earned a master's degree in theology from the University of Southampton.

== Career ==
Before his episcopal ministry, Makumbi worked as a teacher and priest. He was ordained a priest in various parishes and educational roles, including as deputy principal at Misanvu Primary Teachers' College and as deputy head teacher at Kijjabwemi Secondary School. Between 1995 and 1997, he was the diocesan youth secretary for West Buganda Diocese and later served as head teacher of Buzzibwera Senior Secondary School.

On 23 January 2011, Makumbi was consecrated and enthroned as Bishop of West Buganda Diocese, succeeding Bishop Samuel Keefa Kamya Ssemakula.

== Work as Bishop ==
As Bishop of West Buganda, Makumbi focused on education, health and Sanitation projects, including construction and renovation work in the diocese. He oversaw the development of the diocesan headquarters at Kako and supported the expansion of church and community infrastructure.

== Death ==
Makumbi died on 31 May 2015 at the age of 52 after a battle with throat cancer. He died at the Uganda Cancer Institute in Mulago, where he had been admitted for treatment following a series of medical procedures, including surgery in South Africa.

His funeral rites included a requiem service held at St Paul's Cathedral, Kako in Masaka District, with his remains later prepared for burial by family and church officials. He was survived by his wife, Deborah Makumbi and four children.

== See also ==
- Anglican Dioceses of Buganda
- Church of Uganda
