= COLEG =

Organization

COLEG, short for the Colleges Open Learning Exchange Group, was a Scottish charity organization established in January 1995 to facilitate the generation, exchange and use of flexible learning materials. It was formally incorporated in 1998. It was subsumed into other projects in 2009. While not an Open Educational Resources organization, it provided early sharing of electronic resources between different institutions. It was merged into the Scotland's Colleges project in 2009, and ultimately into the rebranded Colleges Development Network.
