= W.D. Gaster =

Unseen character in Undertale

- Undertale character
- "spr_mysteryman.png", a sprite widely speculated to be Gaster in Undertale
- First game: Undertale (2015)
- Created by: Toby Fox

Dr. W.D. Gaster is a fictional character from the 2015 video game Undertale, created by game developer Toby Fox. In the game's lore, Gaster was Alphys's predecessor as the Royal Scientist for the Underground's kingdom of monsters. He was said to have created the Core in Hotland, which converts geothermal energy into magical electricity for use in the underground. However, he one day vanished without a trace, and was said to have been "shattered across time and space". He cannot normally be encountered in the game, and is never discussed directly as part of the game's main narrative. Players can only encounter events related to Gaster under a specific RNG condition called the "fun" value or by modifying the game files. A sprite from one of these events, internally named "Mystery Man", is generally used by fans to portray Gaster, though the sprite's connection to the character is not yet fully confirmed.

The existence and nature of Gaster has been the subject of speculation among both fans and critics. Multiple theories exist about him, including ones suggesting that he is related to Sans and Papyrus, and that he is a major force behind the story of Undertale's parallel game Deltarune, due to multiple reasons, such as the game featuring allusions to his theme and his hidden "Entry Number Seventeen" (stylized in all caps and the Wingdings font) from Undertale. It has also been argued that his first two initials are a reference to Wingdings, due to his aforementioned entry using the font. This indicates that he could possibly be a skeleton like Sans and Papyrus, who are also named after fonts; Comic Sans and Papyrus respectively.

== Concept and history ==
Although he does not appear physically in the game's main story, Dr. W.D. Gaster is alluded to through cryptic references in rare dialogue from minor characters. Gaster's existence in Undertale was discovered after players looked through the game's code. There are two sprites within the game's files that are believed to represent Gaster, known as "Mystery Man" and "Redacted". According to IGN, the "Mystery Man" sprite appears to be based on the design of the character Uboa from Yume Nikki.

When Undertale creator Toby Fox released update version 1.001 for Undertale, fans believed that certain lines of dialogue added to the game suggested that Gaster was indeed a real character in the game. This update added a rare event that would allow the player to enter a room containing the "Mystery Man" sprite, which was originally only possible by modifying the game's code.

A rare possible event in the town of Snowdin in Undertale has the protagonist receive a mysterious phone call asking "Can I speak to G..." before the caller decides it was a wrong number and disconnects. Many fans speculated that the "G..." was intended to signify "Gaster". Undertale was localized into the Japanese language by 8-4, and this particular line was considered difficult to translate. There is no way in the Japanese syllabary to represent only the letter "G", and an early draft translation by 8-4 used が (Ga), which would have been taken as further confirmation the line referred to Gaster. Toby Fox wished for certain mysteries to remain mysteries, and the first line of the phone call instead remained intact in English in the Japanese version, released in 2017.

Despite the numerous direct references to Gaster in Undertale, the game's spiritual successor, Deltarune, which contains copious overt references to Undertale, does not contain any direct references to the name "Gaster" as of the release of its fifth chapter, with the exception of two easter eggs during name-entry sequences. However, numerous pieces of evidence imply that W.D. Gaster is tied to the game's overarching story.

== Appearances ==
=== Undertale ===
Gaster is referenced in Undertale at various points, but does not have any confirmed appearance in the game. Hidden characters called Gaster Followers can appear in the game with certain "fun" values and divulge details about Gaster. The appearance of all Gaster Followers are simply grayscale versions of other characters that appear elsewhere in the game with the exception of the third, whose counterpart only appears in Deltarune. They describe Gaster falling into "his creation", and "shattering across time and space", with one claiming that Gaster is still nearby and "listening". A Tumblr post by Undertale creator Toby Fox, written from the perspective of Sans, also contained language suggesting that someone was "listening". Gaster is also indirectly referenced during a fight against Sans, who wields weapons that are labeled "Gaster Blasters" in the game's files.

If a player attempts to name the fallen human Gaster, the game will immediately restart. They can also modify the game to place their character in a room internally labelled "room_gaster", containing a message written in the Wingdings font (and when translated, in all caps) titled "Entry Number Seventeen", in reference to a missing entry in a series of logs in Undertale's main story. There is also a secret "sound test" menu, which contains a song titled "Gaster's Theme".

=== Deltarune ===
While Gaster has not yet made a direct appearance in Deltarune as of Chapter 5, there are numerous allusions to him in the game and in related media. If a player attempts to enter the name Gaster at any point of the introductory sequence of Deltarune, the game will restart. Gaster's Theme is also referenced in the game's soundtrack, on old revisions of Deltarune's website, and in tweets posted by the official Undertale/Deltarune account in pre-Chapter release "takeovers". Additionally, the sound that plays in "room_gaster"—the location of the entry in Undertale—reappears in Deltarune, sometimes playing at different speeds. The mysterious voice that speaks to the player when creating a "vessel" is also theorized to be Gaster.

== Analysis ==
The identity of W.D. Gaster was identified as one of gaming's biggest mysteries, by both Gaming Bolt and The Gamer staff, the latter who noted that Gaster was popular with roleplayers online. Kotaku writer Nathan Grayson noted that W.D. Gaster was the only secret left remaining in Undertale, discussing how, despite all of the work put into investigating Gaster, the mystery still remains unsolved, suggesting that the data in the game files could have been leftover content not intended to be found. Tunic game designer Andrew Shouldice spoke of his appreciation for "risky secrets" like Gaster that cause players to "consider a new approach that'd never crossed their mind, or reveal a submerged mechanic that they'd never interfaced with."

Gaster has been a popular figure in the Undertale community, the mystery behind his existence sparking a large investigation by members of the community into the truth around him. Kotaku writer Heather Alexandra suggested that he could be a long-lost relative of Sans and Papyrus, citing design notes that allude to a character related to Papyrus and claiming that this could be Gaster. Players have speculated that the "W. D." in Gaster's name could stand for "Wingdings", which furthered the connection to Sans and Papyrus, who are named after Comic Sans and Papyrus fonts respectively; Nathan Grayson also believed that strange symbols found in Sans' lab may also be in Wingdings. Additionally, a common interpretation of the 'shattered across time and space' line suggests his existence was spread all across space and time. In reference to the NPCs found through file modification, some believe that they are fragments of Gaster speaking about the experience of existing across time and space. Writer Mattia Podini discussed the presence of techniques he suggested were used by Toby Fox to manipulate players into responding to certain details in a certain way. For Gaster, he suggested that he served as an example of players experiencing apophenia, the perception of meaningful connections between unrelated things. He argued that many things players took for granted to be true about Gaster, such as his appearance, character connections, and other background details, were not confirmed to be true.

Gaster has also been heavily theorized when discussing Deltarune, due to the game's numerous allusions to him. Fanbyte writer Kara Dennison speculated that Deltarune would eventually answer questions surrounding W.D. Gaster and other mysteries from Undertale. The mysterious voice that speaks to the player during certain parts of the game, and "takes over" the official Undertale/Deltarune Twitter account prior to a Chapter release, is commonly believed to be Gaster, due to its similar way of speaking, and its theme using Gaster's leitmotif, alongside other smaller connections. Other aspects of the game have also been speculated to relate to Gaster, such as the "strange someone" who made the superbosses Jevil and Spamton go insane.
