= Castro (surname) =

Castro is a Portuguese and Galician surname popular in Spanish and Portuguese speaking countries, coming from Latin castrum, meaning a castle or fortress. Its English equivalent is Chester.

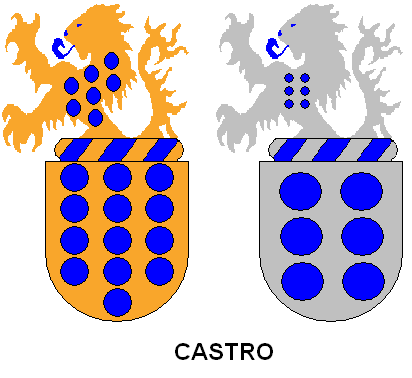
House of Castro coat of arms (Portugal).

== Geographical distribution ==
As of 2014, 19.2% of all known bearers of the surname Castro were residents of Mexico (frequency 1:254), 12.0% of Colombia (1:157), 10.0% of Brazil (1:801), 6.8% of the Philippines (1:583), 6.3% of the United States (1:2,249), 5.2% of Argentina (1:325), 4.8% of Peru (1:261), 4.7% of Spain (1:387), 4.0% of Venezuela (1:299), 3.9% of Chile (1:179), 3.0% of Ecuador (1:206), 2.6% of Honduras (1:134), 2.4% of Guatemala (1:269), 2.0% of Costa Rica (1:93), 1.8% of Cuba (1:251), 1.7% of Nicaragua (1:141), 1.5% of Bolivia (1:276), 1.5% of El Salvador (1:165), 1.5% of Portugal (1:278), 1.4% of the Dominican Republic (1:297) and 1.1% of Mozambique (1:1,011).

In Spain, the frequency of the surname was higher than national average (1:387) in the following autonomous communities:

1. Galicia (1:95)
2. Canary Islands (1:282)
3. Andalusia (1:310)
4. Asturias (1:338)

In Costa Rica, the frequency of the surname was higher than national average (1:93) in the following provinces:

1. Alajuela Province (1:65)
2. San José Province (1:75)

== People ==
- Alicia Castro (born 1949), Argentine diplomat
- Álvaro de Castro (1878–1928), Portuguese politician
- Américo Castro (1885–1972), Spanish historian
- Anabella Castro, Colombian model
- André Castro (born 1988), Portuguese footballer
- Ángel Castro y Argiz (1875–1956), father of Cuban leaders Fidel and Raúl Castro
- Anthony Castro (baseball) (born 1995), Venezuelan baseball player
- Ariel Castro (1960–2013), Puerto Rican American kidnapper and rapist
- Arles Castro (born 1979), Colombian track and road cyclist
- Arturo Castro (Mexican actor) (1918–1975)
- Arturo Castro (Guatemalan actor) (born 1985)
- Aureo Castro (1917–1993), Macanese–Portuguese composer, musician and teacher
- Balthazar (Isaac) Orobio de Castro, (c.1617–1687) Jewish philosopher
- Benjamin Castro (disambiguation), multiple people
- Bernadette Castro (born 1944), U.S. politician
- Carlos Castro (disambiguation), multiple people
- Carol Castro (born 1984), Brazilian actress and producer
- César Castro (diver) (born 1982), Brazilian diver
- Cipriano Castro (1858–1924), President of Venezuela
- Claudia Mabel Castro (born 1968), Chilean entrepreneur
- Cláudio Castro (born 1979), Brazilian lawyer and politician
- Claudio Castro (born 1983), Chilean politician
- Cláudio Corrêa e Castro (1928–2005), Brazilian actor
- Crispin Castro Monroy (born 1936), Mexican politician
- Cristian Castro (born 1974), Mexican singer
- Daniel Castro (disambiguation), multiple people
- Darcy Castro, American politician
- David Castro (swimmer) (born 1964), Brazilian swimmer
- David Castro (actor) (born 1996), American actor
- Dionísio Castro (born 1963), Portuguese long-distance runner
- Domingos Castro (born 1963), Portuguese long-distance runner
- Eddie Castro (disambiguation), multiple people
- Eduardo Castro (born 1954), Mexican long-distance runner
- Eduardo Viveiros de Castro (born 1951), Brazilian ethnologist
- Ernesto Castro (born 1971), Salvadoran politician
- Elizabeth Castro, U.S. writer on web sites
- Fernando Castro (disambiguation)
- Fernando Ruiz de Castro (disambiguation)
- Fidel Castro (1926–2016), former First Secretary of the Communist Party of Cuba
- Fidel Castro (disambiguation), multiple people
- Francisco Castro (disambiguation), multiple people
- Germán Castro Caycedo (1940–2021), Colombian journalist and writer
- Giovanna Arbunic Castro (born 1964), Chilean chess player
- Glaiza de Castro (born 1986), Filipina actress
- Gonzalo Castro (born 1987), German footballer
- Gonzalo Castro Irizábal (born 1984), Uruguayan footballer
- Guillén de Castro y Bellvis (1569–1631), Spanish dramatist
- Harold Castro (born 1993), Venezuelan baseball player
- Héctor Castro (1904–1960), Uruguayan footballer
- Henri Castro (1786–1865), pioneer of the Republic of Texas
- Inês de Castro (1325–1355), Galician noblewoman and Queen of Portugal after her death
- Isabel Castro (artist) (born 1954), Mexican-born American artist
- Israel Castro (disambiguation), multiple people
- Jason Castro (disambiguation), multiple people
- Jayson Castro (born 1986), Filipino basketball player
- Jesús Castro (disambiguation), multiple people
- Joaquin Castro (born 1974), American politician
- Jorge Castro (disambiguation), multiple people
- José Castro (disambiguation), multiple people
- Joseph Castro (disambiguation), multiple people
- Juan Castro (born 1972), Mexican baseball player
- Juan José Castro (1895–1968), Argentine composer
- Juanita Castro (1933–2023), Cuban revolutionary, sister of Fidel and Raul Castro
- Julia de Castro (born 2002), Brazilian politician
- Julian Castro (born 1974), American politician
- Julián Castro Contreras (1810 – 1875), President of Venezuela
- Kat de Castro (born 1978), Filipino broadcaster and daughter of Noli de Castro
- Kervin Castro (born 1999), Venezuelan baseball pitcher for the San Francisco Giants
- Lenny Castro (born 1956), American percussionist and musician
- Luciano Castro (born 1975), Argentine actor
- Lúcio de Castro (1910–2004), Brazilian athlete
- Luís Castro (disambiguation), multiple people
- Luz Dary Castro (born 1978), Colombian shot putter and discus thrower
- Marco Castro (born 1976), a Peruvian American film director
- Margalida Castro (1943–2024), Colombian actress
- María Elisa Castro (born 1954), Argentine politician
- Mariela Castro (born 1962), Cuban LGBT and sex education activist, and daughter of Raúl Castro
- Matheus de Castro (c. 1594–1679), Indian Roman Catholic bishop
- Mauricio Castro (born 1981), Honduran footballer
- Maxloren Castro (born 2007), Peruvian footballer
- Mercedes Castro (born 1972), Spanish writer
- Michael Castro (disambiguation), multiple people
- Miguel Castro (born 1994), Dominican professional baseball player
- Nelson Castro (disambiguation), multiple people
- Noli de Castro (born 1949), Filipino broadcast journalist and politician
- Oscar Castro (disambiguation), multiple people
- Pedro Fernández de Castro (disambiguation), multiple people
- Plácido de Castro (disambiguation), multiple people
- Quévin Castro (2001–2026), Portuguese footballer
- Rafael Castro (born 2003), American basketball player
- Ramón Castro (disambiguation), multiple people
- Raquel Castro (born 1994), American actress
- Raul Hector Castro (1916–2015), U.S. politician
- Raúl Castro (born 1931), First Secretary of the Communist Party of Cuba
- Raúl Castro (disambiguation), multiple people
- Roberto Michael Castro (born 1989), Ecuadorian footballer
- Rodolfo Castro (born 1999), Dominican baseball player
- Rosalía de Castro (1837–1885), Spanish Galician language writer and poet
- Sal Castro (1933–2013), Mexican-American educator and activist
- Saleta Castro (born 1989), a Spanish triathlete
- Salvador Castaneda Castro (1888–1965), Salvadorian politician
- Sebastian Castro (disambiguation), multiple people
- Sergio de Castro (disambiguation), multiple people
- Sheilla Castro (born 1983), Brazilian volleyball player
- Starlin Castro (born 1990), Dominican baseball player
- Teresita de Castro (born 1948), Filipina judge
- Thomas de Castro (c. 1621–1684), Indian Roman Catholic clergyman
- Verónica Castro (born 1952), Mexican actress
- Willi Castro (born 1997), Puerto Rican baseball player
- Xiomara Castro (born 1959), Honduran politician
- Yaakov de Castro (1525–1610), Spanish-Egyptian scholar, judge and exponent of Jewish law
- Yair Castro (born 1997), Colombian footballer
- Zulema Castro de Peña (c. 1920–2013), Argentine activist

== See also ==
- House of Castro
- Duke of Castro (disambiguation)
- de Castro
- Castro (disambiguation)
- Chester (surname)
