= Chester (surname) =

Chester is a surname of English origin. Its Romance (Italian, Portuguese, Spanish, and Galician) equivalent is Castro.

Notable people with the surname include:

- Albert Chester (1886–1943), English footballer
- Art Chester (1899–1949), American air racer
- Beverly Chester-Burton (born 1963), American politician
- Bob Chester (1908–1977), American jazz and pop music bandleader and tenor saxophonist.
- Charlie Chester (1914–1997), British stand-up comedian
- Craig Chester (born 1965), American actor and screenwriter
- Darren Chester (born 1967), Australian politician
- Elroy Chester (1969–2013), American murderer
- Felicia Chester (born 1988), American basketball player
- Frank Chester (politician) (1901–1966), Canadian politician
- Frank Chester (umpire) (1895–1957), English first-class cricketer and notable international cricket umpire
- Gary Chester (1924–1987), American session drummer and drum teacher
- George Randolph Chester (1869–1924), American writer and screenwriter
- F. G. L. Chester (1899–1946), also known as Gort Chester, British soldier and member of Z Special Unit in Borneo
- Harry Chester (1806–1868), British civil servant
- Ilan Chester (born 1952), Venezuelan singer, keyboardist, arranger and composer; he was born in Israel as Ilan Czenstochowski
- James Chester (born 1989), Welsh footballer who plays for Hull City
- John Chester (disambiguation), several people
- Joseph Lemuel Chester (1821–1882), American genealogist
- Nicola Chester, British nature writer
- Norman Chester (1907–86), British political economist associated with Nuffield College, Oxford
- Peter Chester, English convicted murderer and paedophile
- Peter Chester (governor) (1720–1799), last governor of the British territory of West Florida
- Raymond Chester (born 1948), retired American football tight end
- Robert Chester (disambiguation)
- William Chester (disambiguation)
