= Fidel Castro (disambiguation) =

Fidel Castro (1926–2016) was a communist revolutionary leader of Cuba.

Fidel Castro may also refer to:

== People ==
- Fidel Castro Díaz-Balart (1949–2018), Cuban nuclear physicist and government official

== Other uses ==
- My Life: A Spoken Autobiography (Spanish: Fidel Castro: Biografía a dos Voces), a Spanish language biography published as "Fidel Castro"
- Fidel Castro Secondary School, Tanzania
- List of things named after Fidel Castro, listing many things named "Fidel Castro"

== See also ==
- Fidel Castro Smith (born 1963), British boxer
- Fidel (disambiguation)
- Castro (disambiguation)
- Comandante (disambiguation)
