= Plascencia =

Plascencia is a surname. Notable people with the surname include:

- Benjamín Castillo Plascencia (1945–2026), Mexican Roman Catholic prelate
- Francisco Javier Plascencia Alonso (born 1956), Mexican politician
- Gabriel Plascencia (born 2001), American football player
- Javier Plascencia (born 1967), Mexican chef
- Salvador Plascencia (born 1976), American writer

== See also ==
- Alfredo Placencia (1875–1930), Mexican priest and poet
- Placencia, a town in Belize
