= Zulema (name) =

Zulema (also Zuleima) is a Spanish-language feminine name that may refer to:

- Zulema (1947–2013), American singer
- Zulema Castro de Peña (c. 1920–2013), Argentine human rights activist
- Zulema de la Cruz (born 1958), Spanish pianist and composer
- Zulema Fuentes-Pila (born 1977), Spanish distance runner
- Zulema Jattin Corrales (born 1969), Colombian politician, and former Senator of Colombia
- Zulema Maria Eva Menem (born 1970), daughter of Zulema Yoma and Argentine President Carlos Menem
- Zulema Romero (born 2001), Spanish businesswoman and politician
- Zulema Tomás (born 1962), Minister of Health of Peru in 2019
- Zulema Yoma (born 1942), former First Lady of Argentina
- Zuleima Araméndiz (born 1975), Colombian javelin thrower
- Zulema l'Astròloga, name given in later tradition to the mother of Ali of La Palomera (fl. 1229)

== See also ==
- Zuleyma, Mexican wrestler
