= Charles Chester =

Charles Chester may refer to:

- Charles Chester (cricketer) (1869–1940), English cricketer for Derbyshire
- Sir Charles Bagot Chester, 7th Baronet (1724–1755)
- Charlie Chester (1914–1997), British comedian and TV and radio presenter
- Charles Bagot Chester (1770–1838), English MP

== See also ==
- Chester (disambiguation)
