= WAWI =

WAWI may refer to:

- Wawi, a village in Thailand
- Wawi (froghopper) - a genus of froghoppers
- William Alanson White Institute
- Women At Work International, NGO based in Uganda
- WAWI (FM), a radio station (89.7 FM) licensed to Lawrenceburg, Tennessee, United States
