= John Lorimer (surgeon) =

American physician

John Lorimer (1732–1795) was a Scottish surgeon, mathematician, politician and cartographer in the 18th century.

He was born at his father's farm of Alnaboyle in the parish of Mortlach, Banffshire, the son of John Lorimer and Isobel Green. He died at his home in Portland Place, Charlotte Street, London, England on 15 July 1795.

Lorimer served as a surgeon for the British army in North America between 1758 and 1784, participating in both the French and Indian War and the American Revolution. He was a fellow of the Royal College of Physicians of Edinburgh, and author of the book A Concise Essay on Magnetism; with an Account of the Declination and Inclination of the Magnetic Needle; and an Attempt to ascertain the Cause of the Variation thereof, published in 1795.

== Experiences in West Florida ==
Lorimer was a land speculator who owned a thousand acres on Thompson's Creek, Mississippi and a second grant north of Natchez, Mississippi. "Original Grantee/Claimant: Doctor John Lorimer, 2000 acres, Walnut Hills. Patent date: May 6, 1776."

At the time Pensacola surrendered to the Spanish, Lorimer was listed as a magistrate.

In 1778, Peter Chester, Governor of the British Colony of West Florida, appointed Lorimer as a "Botanist" for the Province of West Florida.

In 1774, Lorimer went on an expedition up the Mississippi River to map the western boundary of the Colony of West Florida from the mouth of the Yazoo River to Bayou Manchac. He went along with George Gauld and Thomas Hutchins not only because he was a surgeon, but also because his mathematical skills for determining latitude and longitude were greatly desired. "The latitudes of the entrance of the river Yazou, Natchez, Manchac and some other parts of the river were taken by Doctor Lorimer, which were a great correction and satisfaction in laying down this plan." Afterwards, Thomas Hutchins would publish several publications about his experiences and observations in West Florida. He used and re-published much of the written materials and charts produced by Lorimer, Gauld and Lieutenant Philip Pittman under his own name. So would the colonial naturalist Bernard Romans. Even in those days of loose copyright laws, using other people's creations was well known. In correspondence with General Thomas Gage, General Frederick Haldimand sent him some of Gauld's maps along with his report, with the proviso that no one else should copy the maps drawn by Gauld.

== Society memberships ==
Lorimer was a fellow of the Royal College of Physicians of Edinburgh.

Lorimer became a member of the American Philosophical Society in Philadelphia.

Lorimer was a member of the Coffee House Philosophical Society: "John Lorimer, MD, University of St. Andrews, 1764, elected November 26, 1784. Fellow Royal College of Physicians of Edinburgh (FRCPE 1791); visited America from 1764. Lived at Charlotte Street, Portland Place, London."

Lorimer was a member of the Royal Icelandic Literary Society.

== Publications ==
- Lorimer, John. 1795. A concise essay on magnetism; with an account of the declination and inclination of the magnetic needle; and an attempt to ascertain the cause of the variation thereof. By John Lorimer. London: Printed for the author, and sold by W. Faden.
- Lorimer, Dr. J. 1775. “Description of a New Dipping Needle. By Mr. J. Lorimer, of Pensacola, in a Letter to Sir John Pringle, Bart., PRS.” The Royal Society: Philosophical Transactions. Volume LXV. Pages 79–84. ISSN 0260-7085. URL: https://www.jstor.org/stable/106178.
- “Map of the Mississippi River from the Mouth of the Yazoo River to the southern part of Louisiana.” 1774. Manuscript, pen, ink, pencil and water color. Col. Map 244 X 121 cm. ([Peter Force map collection]). Scale 1:126,720; 2 English miles to an inch. Relief shown by hachures. Shows campsites of the expedition with dates. Includes descriptive text. Library of Congress Map: G4042 1774 .M3 Vault. LC copy imperfect: upper right corner missing. Notes: “The latitudes of the entrance of the river Yazou, Natchez, Manchac and some other parts of the river were taken by Doctor Lorimer, which were a great correction and satisfaction in laying down this plan.” Library of Congress- Geography and Map Division. LCCN: 74-696154/MAPS.
- Lorimer, Dr. 1769-1771. “Letter from Dr. Lorimer, of West Florida, to Hugh Williamson, MD, Containing some Remarks on the Climate, Vegetable Productions, etc.” Transactions of the American Philosophical Society held at Philadelphia. Volume I, pages 250254.
