= George Gauld (surveyor) =

George Gauld (1731–1782) was a British military engineer, artist, cartographer, geographer and surveyor.

== Life ==
George Gauld was born in Ardbrack, Banffshire, Scotland, in 1731, and was educated at King's College in Aberdeen, where he received his Master of Arts degree. He became a cartographer and painter, and was on HMS Deptford in 1761, same ship that proved John Harrison's marine chronometer to be correct.

Prior to the French and Indian War (Seven Years' War) the British possessed few detailed maps of the interior of North America. The land beyond the Appalachian Mountains had been dominated by the French and their Indian allies. However, British colonial expansion and the military operations led to a flurry of mapping in the form of reconnaissance and route maps, fortification plans, and map depicting engagements. "At the conclusion of the war in 1763, Britain was left in possession of a vast and little known addition to its seaboard colonies. To facilitate the administration and development of Canada and the western territory, topographical surveys were initiated. Notable examples are the James Murray survey of the St. Lawrence River valley (1761–63), the first detailed hydrographic survey of the Ohio River by Harry Gordon and Thomas Hutchins (1766), Philip Pittman's surveys of the Mississippi and Iberville River (now known as Bayou Manchac) (1765), and the surveys of East and West Florida by David Taitt, George Gauld and Bernard Romans (1772–73)."

Between 1764 and 1781, Gauld was assigned by the British Admiralty to chart the waters off the coast of the British colony of West Florida. "After Florida came into the possession of Great Britain, the Lords Commissioners of the Admiralty, sent out Mr George Gauld to make a thorough survey of the whole coast. He was employed in surveying the coasts and harbours of West Florida, and the west coast of East Florida from the summer of 1764, to the year 1781, when he was made prisoner by the Spaniards, in their invasion of Florida. These surveys were not published until the year 1790, after the death of Mr Gauld. Much remains to be done by our own government in improving the charts of this dangerous coast. It does not appear precisely at what time."

A description of Jamaica mentions Gauld's early work. "Modern charts give only the outline of this area; but there is a particularly interesting chart, "Plan of Port Royal Harbour", by George Gauld, "Surveyor General of the Coast of West Florida", the field work for which was apparently completed in I772, which shows the probable make-up of the Plum Point area at the time. The chart was published in London by W. Faden in I798 and gives the impression of careful work."

Gaul was elected to the American Philosophical Society in 1770, and in 1773 he presented some of his findings to the society in the hopes that they would be published in the Transactions. Although his report was not published, it became one of the first submissions entered into the Society's collections. This manuscript also includes a letter from Dr. John Lorimer to Gauld, and a sketch of the Middle and Yellow Rivers of West Florida by Thomas Hutchins.

In 1774, Gauld, Lorimer, Thomas Hutchins, Captain Thomas Davey, RN, and Major Alexander Dickson of the 16th Regiment of Foot, made a mapping expedition from Manchac to the mouth of the Yazoo River. Major Dickson went with them for the first part of the survey, and helped them investigate the Manchac region, but evidently left the group at Natchez. Dr. Lorimer made careful measurements of latitude at Natchez, and then the remainder of the party continued further north to the mouth of the Yazoo River. Major Dickson was back in Pensacola by 30 April, although it is unknown if he returned by going up the Manchac to the Iberville River, or south to New Orleans. He appeared back in Pensacola almost two weeks after the return of the main party that went up further north. They had hoped to be able to find a route up the Mississippi River without having to go through Spanish controlled New Orleans. The second reason for this map is to show the landholdings of various planters and speculators. Many were speculators, including Gauld and Lorimer. The land they owned on Thompson's Creek were acquired by Lorimer and Gauld in 1772, and then visited by them, perhaps for the first time, during this trip. This cheap land was mostly purchased for speculation, because running the property profitably as a plantation would have been too difficult as absentee landlords from their homes on the Gulf Coast.

Later, Thomas Hutchins would write an account of this journey, with acknowledgment to the information he had received from Gauld: "It may be proper to observe that I have had the assistance of the remarks and surveys, so far as relates to the mouths of the Mississippi and the coast and foundings of West Florida, of the late ingenious Mr. George Gauld, a Gentleman who was employed by the Lords of the Admiralty for the express purpose of making an accurate chart of the above mentioned places."

Many people copied his maps and charts in those days before strict copyright laws. A book by William Stork reputedly featured a plagiarised copy of a map by Gauld, who later wrote (speaking of himself in the third person):

In the summer of 1765 he made an accurate survey of the Bay of Spiritu Santo, which soon afterwards appeared in Stork's History of East Florida. How it happened to be published there we cannot pretend to say; but it is the only part of the many surreptitious sketches, which have been pirated from Mr. Gauld's works, that has been literally and pretty correctly copied; tho' there is an error of about 30 miles or more in the Latitude.

In 1776, Gauld was forced to suspend his work in the Dry Tortugas and Florida Keys due to the depredations of American privateers, and he was taken prisoner at the Siege of Pensacola in 1781. He was carried off first to Cuba and then to New York.

== Return to England and death ==
He was later repatriated to Britain, and died shortly afterwards in London.

He is buried at the cemetery of Whitefield's Tabernacle, Tottenham Court Road, London. His memorial, of plain Portland stone, reads: "In memory of George Gauld, A.M. Surveyor of the Coasts of Florida &c. Who was born at Ardbrack in the parish of Botriphny, Banffshire, North Britain; and educated at King's College, Aberdeen. A man of real abilities without affection, a sincere friend without flattery, and religious without hypocrisy or superstition. He died at London on 8th June 1782, aged 50 years. Psalm XXX verse 37. Mark the perfect man, and behold the upright; for the end of that man is peace."

== Bibliography ==
- Gauld, George. 1767. "British Pensacola." Painting. "Pensacola was becoming something more than a garrison town by the time Gauld made this splendid painting. There were now a number of fine houses and structures and an especially impressive Governor's Palace while the fort had been strengthened and made more efficient. It seems likely the town had over two hundred houses made of timber. Pensacola was still, however, mainly a military and trading outpost, its principal link to the outside world being primarily by sea." Colonial Pensacola. 1974. Page 78.
- Gauld, George. Date not given. "A Plan of the Mouths of the Mississippi by George Gauld, MA [For the Right Honourable the Earl of Dartmouth.]" M.P. G530, Public Records Office, Kew, England.
- Gauld, George. 1778. "A Plan of the Coast of Part of West Florida & Louisiana including the River Mississippi from its Entrances as high as the River Yazous. Surveyed by George Gauld, M.A., for the Right Honourable the Board of Admiralty." ["This survey has been taken at different times, and reduced to one general scale in the year 1778." Inset: "A Plan of Manchac 1774." Ministry of Defense, Hydrographic Office (MODHD) D958 88, in Taunton, England. Photocopy in Geoscience Map Library, Louisiana State University.
- Gauld, George. 1779. "A Plan of Manchac." [Inset "Part of the Mississippi near Manchac 1774." "For His Excellency Sir Henry Clinton, K.B., Commander-in-Chief, &c. &c. at the request of Brigadier General Campbell 1779.” Clinton Papers, Williams L. Clements Library, University of Michigan, Ann Arbor, Michigan.
- Gauld, George. 1790. “An account of the surveys of Florida, &c: with directions for sailing from Jamaica or the West Indies, by the west end of Cuba, and through the Gulph of Florida. To accompany Mr. Gauld's charts.” Published by W. Faden; to be sold by him; and by Messrs. Mount and Page, 1790. 27 pages. See: An Account of the Surveys of Florida
- Ware, John D., and Robert Right Rea. 1982. George Gauld, surveyor and cartographer of the Gulf Coast. Gainesville: University Presses of Florida. ISBN 0813007089; 9780813007083.
