= John Lorimer =

John Lorimer may refer to:

- John Lorimer (surgeon) (1732–1795), British surgeon, mathematician, politician and cartographer
- John Henry Lorimer (1856–1936), Scottish painter
- John Gordon Lorimer (civil servant) (1870–1914), British officer in the Indian Civil Service
- Sir John Lorimer (British Army officer) (born 1962), British general
