= John Chester (disambiguation) =

John Chester is a filmmaker.

John Chester may also refer to:

- John Chester (Connecticut soldier) (1749–1809), militia officer and public official
- John Chester (rower) (born 1935), British Olympic rower
- John Chester (university president) (1785–1829), president of Rensselaer Polytechnic Institute
- John Willie Chester, professional rugby league footballer who played in the 1900s and 1910s
- John Chester of the Chester baronets
- Johnny Chester (born 1941), Australian rock'n'roll pioneer and country music artist

== See also ==
- Chester (disambiguation)
