= Francisco Castro =

Francisco Castro may refer to:

- Francisco Castro (footballer, born 1910), Portuguese footballer
- Francisco Castro (footballer, born 1979), Portuguese footballer
- Francisco Castro (footballer, born 1990), Chilean footballer
- Francisco Castro Ada (1934–2010), Northern Mariana Islands politician
- Francisco Castro Lalupú (born 1973), Peruvian Roman Catholic prelate
- Francisco Castro Trenti, Mexican politician
- Francisco Castro (jumper) (1922–2008), Puerto Rican long and triple jumper
- Francisco Castro (hurdler), Chilean hurdler and high jumper at the 2008 Ibero-American Championships in Athletics – Results
- Francisco María Castro (1770–1831), American landowner and rancher in California
