= Castro brothers =

Castro brothers may refer to:

- Fidel Castro and Raúl Castro, Cuban communist leaders and revolutionaries
  - Ramón Castro Ruz, the lesser-known older brother to Fidel and Raúl
- Joaquin Castro and Julian Castro, U.S. Democratic politicians from San Antonio who are identical twins
- Cleveland kidnapper Ariel Castro and his brothers
- Los Hermanos Castro, Mexican singing group

== See also ==
- Castro (surname)
