= Roman Catholic Diocese of Castro =

Roman Catholic Diocese (or See) of Castro may refer to the following former Latin Catholic dioceses, now Latin Catholic titular sees :

- Roman Catholic Diocese of Castro del Lazio, with see in Castro, Lazio, a destroyed town in the province of Viterbo, Italy
- Roman Catholic Diocese of Castro di Puglia, with see in Castro, Apulia, a comune in the province of Lecce, Italy
- Roman Catholic Diocese of Castro di Sardegna, with see in a former town within the comune of Oschiri, Sardinia, Italy

== See also ==
- Castro (disambiguation)
