= Rory Carroll =

Irish journalist

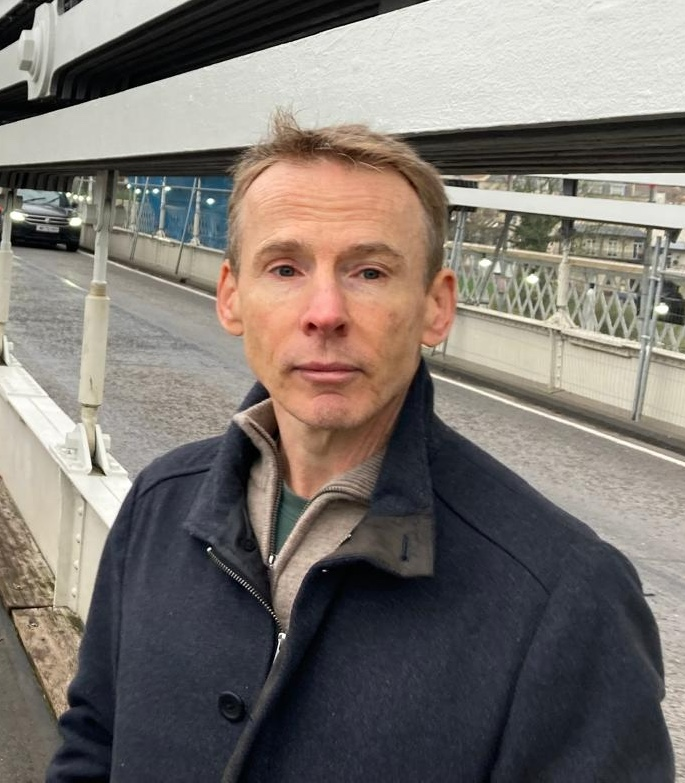
- Born: Dublin, Ireland
- Education: Blackrock College, Trinity College Dublin, Dublin City University
- Occupation: Journalist
- Employer: The Guardian
- Known for: Reporting on international conflicts, kidnapping in Iraq, author of three books
- Notable work: Comandante, Killing Thatcher, "A Rebel and a Traitor"
- Title: Ireland Correspondent
- Awards: Young Journalist of the Year (1997, Northern Ireland)
- Website: rorycarroll.co.uk

Rory Carroll is an Irish journalist working for The Guardian who has reported from the Balkans, Afghanistan, Iraq, Latin America and Los Angeles. He is the Ireland correspondent for The Guardian. He is the author of three books: Comandante (2013), Killing Thatcher (2023), and A Rebel and a Traitor (2026). He has been described by Max Hastings as 'an exceptionally gifted storyteller'.

== Early life and career ==
Born in Dublin, Carroll is a graduate of Blackrock College, Trinity College and Dublin City University. He began his career at The Irish News in Belfast, working as a reporter and diarist from 1995 to 1997, when he was named young journalist of the year in Northern Ireland's media awards.

From 1999, he was deployed by The Guardian as a foreign correspondent in Yemen and Serbia for the aftermath of the Kosovo war.

His report from Qalaye Niazi, where a wedding party was bombed by US planes, fuelled criticism of the Pentagon's air campaign. He reported on the UK's first overseas combat deployment since the first Gulf War.

Trinity awarded him an award as one of ten high-achieving alumni at the 2023 alumni awards.

== Africa correspondent ==
He interviewed a Liberian female rebel commander (nicknamed "Black Diamond"). His article about rape in Congo provided the introduction to an essay by Cherie Blair for a Human Rights Watch volume on torture.

Carroll's article about Hamilton Naki that appeared in The Guardian in 2003 was cited by The New York Times as the original source of their erroneous reporting in 2005 about the role Hamilton Naki played when the first heart transplant was performed at Groote Schuur Hospital in Cape Town, South Africa in 1967.

== Iraq correspondent ==
Carroll took over The Guardian's Baghdad bureau in January 2005. He covered the US occupation, suicide bombings, the formation of Iraqi military and police units, growing sectarian tension, and the death of several friends, including Marla Ruzicka.

On 19 October 2005 he was abducted in Baghdad after carrying out an interview with a victim of Saddam Hussein's regime in Sadr City. The interview had been arranged with the assistance of the Baghdad office of Moqtada al-Sadr. The kidnapping resulted in the Irish government deploying the Army Ranger Wing special forces unit and Arabic-speaking intelligence officers from G2. Carroll was released unharmed by his captors a day later after the British, Irish and Iranian governments, among others, lobbied for his release. The Guardian published Carroll's account of the kidnapping soon after.

== Latin America correspondent ==
In April 2006 he was appointed The Guardian's Latin America correspondent, based in the newspaper's Caracas bureau. His report about oil exploration in Peru's Amazon was disputed by the oil company Perenco. A series he wrote in 2010 on Mexico's drug war was longlisted for the Orwell prize. He wrote an article about aid tourists in Haiti. Carroll's reporting from Venezuela was criticised by radical leftist magazine Red Pepper in 2008 for what it considered his pro-US, anti-Chávez bias. Carroll said at the time that he does not consider himself "a champion of impartiality".

Carroll said "I see a government that is doing some good things and some bad things". "I try to give a sense of how bizarre and funny some things are,"..."like when Chávez, on his own [weekly] TV show, Aló Presidente, ordered the mobilisation of 9,000 soldiers and tanks to the Colombian border. On the one hand that's a serious story, but there is bombast too ... mobilisation on that scale never happened."

On 3 July 2011, The Observer published an article by Carroll featuring an interview with Noam Chomsky concerning the detention of Maria Lourdes Afiuni, an arrested Venezuelan judge, in which Chomsky criticised the government of Hugo Chávez. Chomsky commented in an email exchange with the Znet blogger Joe Emersberger that the report was "deceptive" because of the omission of his comparison of the case of Chelsea Manning (then known as Bradley Manning) with the arrested Venezuelan judge, among other points, and rejected the assertion that Venezuela was less democratic than before Chávez took office: "I don’t think so, and never suggested it." Carroll's article did mention that Chomsky had criticised the US over the Manning case, without providing a quote. The newspaper reproduced the entire transcript of Carroll's exchange with Chomsky the following day on its website. Chomsky had said "[T]he United States is in no position to complain about this. Bradley Manning has been imprisoned without charge, under torture, which is what solitary confinement is".

In an article published in March 2013, shortly after Chávez died, Carroll said that the former Venezuelan President left an "ambiguous legacy of triumph, ruin and uncertainty". "Whither his '21st-century socialist revolution', a unique experiment in power fuelled by charisma and bountiful oil revenues?"

== US West Coast correspondent ==
Carroll was the Guardian's West Coast correspondent from 2012-18, during which time he interviewed Rodney King, Jerry Brown, and Elon Musk. He also reported on the arrest of El Chapo, migration issues centring on the US-Mexico border, and on homelessness in LA. In an article to mark the end of his tenure as West Coast correspondent, he commented on the 'extreme inequality' he witnessed in Los Angeles: 'How do you respond to a city of natural and human wonders, a city pulsing with energy, ambition, creativity, money – dear lord, so much money – which simultaneously hosts in-your-face squalor?'

== Ireland correspondent ==
Since 2018, Carroll has been The Guardian's Ireland correspondent. He has reported on issues including Brexit, organised crime, mother-and-baby homes, and changes to Ireland's abortion law, while continuing to contribute occasionally to reporting about Venezuela, Rome, and the US.

== Comandante ==
Comandante: Hugo Chávez's Venezuela, was published on 7 March 2013—two days after the announcement of Chávez's death—by Penguin Press in the US and by Canongate in the UK. Translations are underway for editions in Brazil, China, Mexico, Spain, Italy, Estonia and Poland. It was named by Foreign Policy magazine as one of the 25 books to read in 2013.

John Sweeney in The Literary Review called the book "a well-considered and painfully fair epitaph" but said it was encumbered with respect for chavistas' aspirations.

In a 2026 interview, Carroll said this was the book he would most like to be remembered for, commenting: '[Chávez's'] reign in Venezuela was a blueprint for turning populist demagoguery into a TV show'

== Killing Thatcher/There Will be Fire ==
Killing Thatcher was published on 4 April 2023 in the UK. For its simultaneous American publication it was titled There Will be Fire. It tells the story of the IRA's near-successful attempt to assassinate British Prime Minister Margaret Thatcher during the Conservative party conference in 1984 (see Brighton hotel bombing).

The book was praised for its storytelling, with several sources comparing it to The Day of the Jackal. The Irish Times said 'Carroll's fascinating, exhaustive account reads like a thriller'. Carroll was also praised for contextualising the story within the political climate of the time and '[exploring] as dispassionately as possible, the mentality that shaped killers like [the bomber, Patrick] Magee'. It was nominated for both the Gordon Burn Prize and a Goodreads Choice award, and became a Sunday Times bestseller.

== A Rebel and a Traitor ==
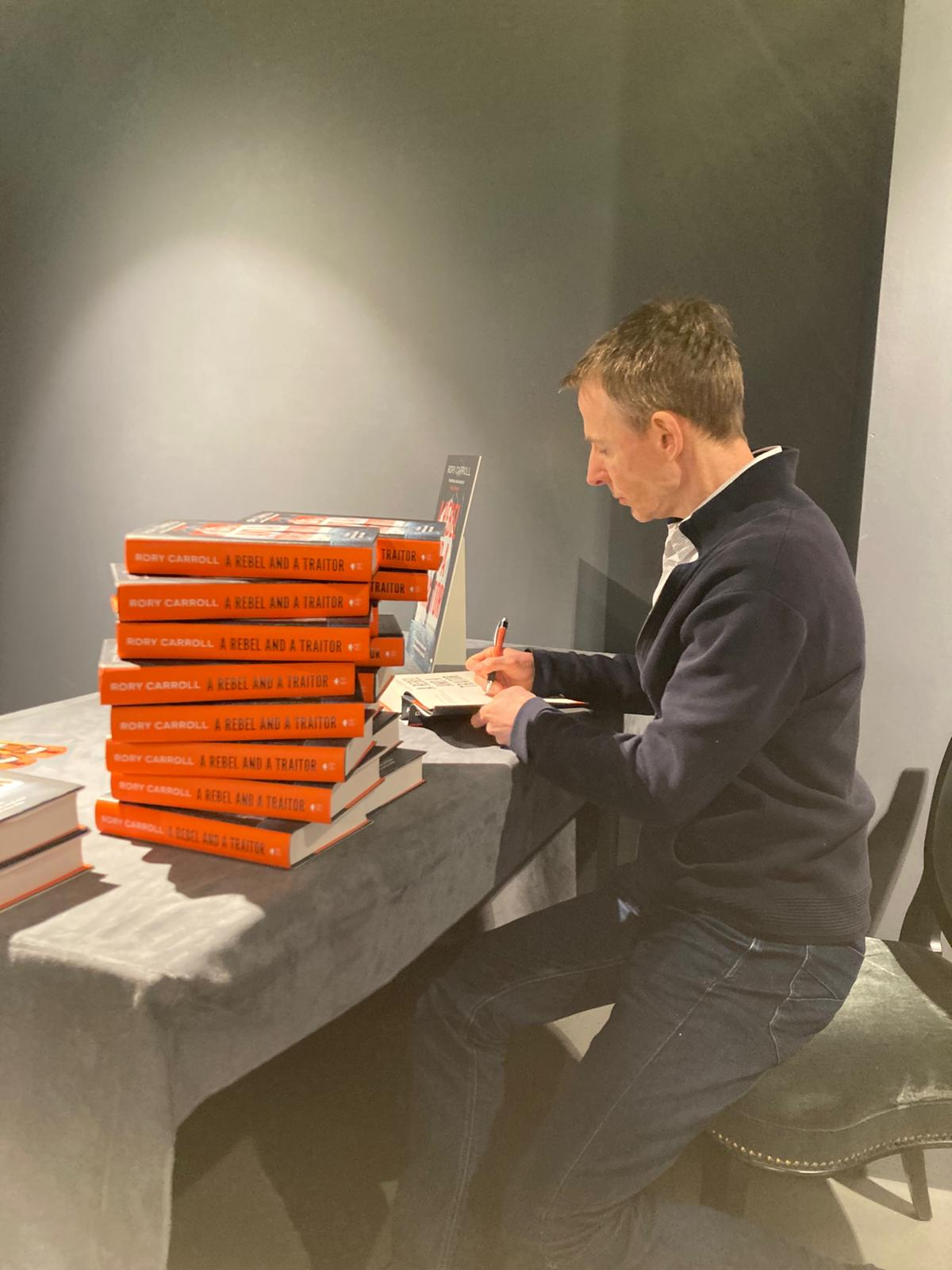
Carroll signing copies of 'A Rebel and a Traitor' in London, March 2026

A Rebel and a Traitor was published on 26 April 2026. It tells the story of Roger Casement, his role in the Easter Rising, and the British security services' efforts to capture him. The Irish Times described the book as having 'the tension-filled, page-turning qualities of a good thriller', with a 'compelling title character' The Guardian also commented on the characterisation of Casement, saying that Carroll 'succeeds in his core task of humanising a complex man, giving him credit for his strengths while never hiding his flaws'. It was a #1 Irish Times bestseller.

== Personal life ==
Carroll lives in Dublin. He is the son of the Irish Times journalist Joe (Joseph) Carroll, who wrote the 1975 book 'Ireland in the War Years, 1939-45'.

== Bibliography ==
- Carroll, Rory. Comandante: Hugo Chávez's Venezuela. Penguin Press, 2013. ISBN 978-0-85786-151-1
- Carroll, Rory. Killing Thatcher: The IRA, the Manhunt and the Long War on the Crown. Canongate, 2023. ISBN 978-0-00-847665-6
- Carroll, Rory. There Will Be Fire: The IRA, the Manhunt and the Long War on the Crown. G. P. Putnam's Sons, 2023. ISBN 978-0-593-41950-2
- Carroll, Rory. A Rebel and a Traitor: Roger Casement, the Easter Rising and the British Secret Service. Canongate, 2026. ISBN 978-0-00-869695-5

== See also ==
- List of kidnappings
