= Comandante =

Comandante may refer to:

- Comandante (rank), also known as commandant or commander, a military rank found in Spanish-speaking countries and Italy
- Comandante (2003 film), a political documentary film about Fidel Castro by Oliver Stone
- Comandante (2023 film), an Italian war drama film
- Comandante (book), a 2013 book about Hugo Chávez by Rory Carroll
- El Comandante (The Commander), the nickname of:
  - Fidel Castro (1926–2016), Cuban politician and revolutionary
  - Ricardo Fort (1968–2013), Argentine entrepreneur and socialite
  - Raúl Castro (footballer) (born 1989), Bolivian midfielder
- El Comandante (TV series), Colombian 2017 telenovela about the Venezuelan president Hugo Chávez

== See also ==
- Commandant
- Commander
