= Jorge Castro =

Jorge Castro may refer to:

- Jorge Castro (athlete), Guatemalan athlete, see 2007 NACAC Championships – Results
- Jorge Castro de la Barra (born 1953), Chilean radio and TV personality
- Jorge Castro (boxer) (1967–2026), Argentine boxer
- Jorge Castro (footballer) (born 1990), Costa Rican footballer
- Jorge Castro (gymnast) (1919–2011), Mexican Olympic gymnast
- Jorge Castro Muñoz (born 1956), Chilean politician, mayor of Valparaíso in 2008–2016
- Jorge Daniel Castro (born 1950), Colombian police office and business administrator
- Jorge Lara Castro (born 1945), Paraguayan lawyer, sociologist, and diplomat

== See also ==
- Castro (disambiguation)
