= Fernando Castro =

Fernando Castro may refer to:

- Fernando Castro (Brazilian footballer) (born 1997), Brazilian footballer
- Fernando Castro Cervantes (1881–1967), Costa Rican businessman and politician
- Fernando Castro (Colombian footballer) (born 1949), Colombian football manager
- Fernando Castro Pacheco (1918–2013), Mexican painter, engraver and illustrator
- Fernando Castro Santos (born 1952), Spanish footballer and manager
- Fernando Castro Trenti (born 1955), Mexican politician from Baja California
- Fernando Araujo de Castro, scientist specialising in materials and semiconductor metrology

== See also ==
- Fernando Ruiz de Castro (disambiguation)
- Fernando (disambiguation)
- Castro (disambiguation)
