= Carlos Castro =

Carlos Castro may refer to:

== Sportspeople ==
- Carlos Castro (footballer, born 1970), Colombian football player and coach
- Carlos Castro Borja (born 1967), Salvadoran footballer
- Carlos Castro (Ecuadorian footballer) (born 1978), Ecuadorian footballer
- Carlos Castro (footballer, born 1974), former Spanish footballer
- Carlos Castro (footballer, born 1995), Spanish footballer
- Carlos Castro (footballer, born 1978), Costa Rican footballer
- Carlos Castro (sprinter) (born 1949), Mexican Olympic sprinter
- Carlos Castro (water polo) (1909–?), Argentine Olympic water polo player
- Carlos Luis Castro (born c. 1963), Costa Rican footballer
- Carlos Castro (Venezuelan footballer) (born 1968)
- Carlos Castro (boxer) (born 1994), American boxer

== Other ==
- Carlos Castro (artist) (born 1981), Colombian interdisciplinary artist
- Carlos Salazar Castro (1800–1867), Central American military officer and politician, provisional president of El Salvador in 1834 and provisional president of Guatemala in 1839
- Carlos Castro (actor) (1913–1958), Argentinian actor, featured in Buenos Aires a la vista, La Verdadera victoria and Intermezzo criminal
- Carlos Castro (writer) (born 1944), Salvadoran writer
- Carlos Castro (journalist) (1945–2011), Portuguese journalist

== See also ==
- Carlos de Castro (1979–2015), Uruguayan footballer
- Carlos de Castro, member of Spanish heavy metal band Barón Rojo
