= Museo de Trajes Regionales =

Museum in Chiapas, Mexico

- Established: 1970
- Location: 1. 38 Guadalupe Victoria San Cristobal de las Casas, Chiapas, Mexico
- Type: Indigenous Chiapan clothing and artifacts
- Curator: Sergio Castro Martinez
- Website: sergiocastrosc.blogspot.com

Museo de Trajes Regionales is located in San Cristobal de las Casas, Chiapas, Mexico. The museum displays more than 100 costumes and dress from the indigenous populations of Chiapas. This is unique because typically all clothing and personal possessions are buried with the dead. Jewelry, musical instruments, costume accessories, religious objects, hats, masks, animal skins and statuettes are on display. The tour is given by the museum collector and owner Sergio Castro Martinez, a knowledgeable local humanitarian. He describes the locations, dress, ceremonies, ways and daily life of the indigenous.

== The Museum ==
Based in San Cristóbal de las Casas, in the Mexican state of Chiapas, the Museum of Regional Costumes is a unique museum displaying traditional costumes, textiles, instruments, tools, masks, religious and celebratory objects from various indigenous Chiapan peoples.

Over 1,000 pieces have been collected over 45 years by Don Sergio Castro3. Many pieces in this collection are very rare, as clothing and personal effects are usually buried with the deceased, and some pieces are no longer created in the same way.

The museum exhibits over 90 costumes representing the different indigenous populations of Chiapas. Jewelry, musical instruments, costume accessories, religious objects, hats, masks, statuettes and animal skins complete the exhibition6. Its owner, Mr. Sergio Castro Martinez, personally leads the guided tours and explains to visitors the places, clothing, ceremonies and daily life of the inhabitants of the state of Chiapas.
