= Israel Castro (disambiguation) =

Israel Castro (born 1980) is a Mexican football player.

Israel Castro may also refer to:

- Shorty Castro or Israel Castro Vélez (1928–2018), a Puerto Rican comedian
- Israel Castro Franco (born 1975), a Brazilian-Salvadoran football player

== See also ==
- Castro (surname)
