= William Stork =

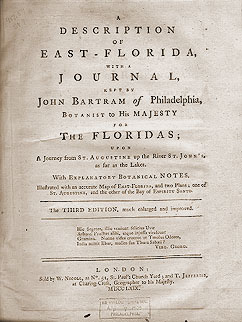
- Title page of Stork's Description of East Florida (1769)
- Occupations: Botanist and historian
- Known for: An Account of East Florida

Dr William Stork (flourished 1751 – 1768) practiced as an oculist in England and the American colonies, and subsequently settled in the British colony of East Florida and published pamphlets encouraging its settlement. Some accounts state that he was initially from Germany, but do not provide primary references which prove the claim.

Stork advertised in London in 1751 and 1752 that he was the oculist to the Princess of Wales. He then advertised his services as an oculist in Jamaica in 1760. He arrived in Philadelphia and advertised his services as an oculist in 1761. He travelled up and down the Eastern colonies from Annapolis, Maryland to Boston between 1761 and 1764. From the diary of Dedham, Massachusetts physician Nathaniel Ames, we know that Stork performed cataract couching. Stork is the first known to have performed cataract couching in the area that became the United States.

The British acquired Florida from the Spanish by the treaty of 1763 which ended the Seven Years' War (i.e. the French and Indian War). Stork made a career change in 1764, and decided to be a plantations agent in the colony of East Florida. Stork was in Florida in 1765, and traveled to England by 1766, when the first edition of his Florida journal was published. He then travelled back to Florida in 1767, and "died with the fright" during an insurrection of indentured servants in August 1768.

His An Account of East Florida, written in English, was published in three editions, two in 1766, subtitled "With Remark on its Future Importance to Trade and Commerce" and a third in 1769, as A description of East-Florida, subtitled "with a journal kept by John Bartram of Philadelphia, botanist to His Majesty for the Floridas : upon a journey from St. Augustine up the river St. John's, as far as the lakes : with explanatory botanical notes, illustrated with an accurate map of East-Florida, and two plans, one of St. Augustine, and the other of the Bay of Espiritu Santo", the latter referring to St. Augustine, Florida, St. Johns River, the bay now known as Tampa Bay, and the botanist John Bartram.

The book reputedly featured a plagiarised copy of a map by George Gauld, who wrote (speaking of himself in the third person):

In the summer of 1765 he made an accurate survey of the Bay of Spiritu Santo, which soon afterwards appeared in Stork's History of East Florida. How it happened to be published there we cannot pretend to say; but it is the only part of the many surreptitious sketches, which have been pirated from Mr. Gauld's works, that has been literally and pretty correctly copied; tho' there is an error of about 30 miles or more in the Latitude.

A manuscript work by John William Gerard de Brahm, in the library of Harvard University, listing the residents of East Florida up to 1771, refers to him as "William Stork, Esq., historian".

The published work by de Brahm lists "Storck William Esqr." as a Florida inhabitant between the years 1763 and 1771 "In the King's Employ" under the category of "Draughtsmen" with the stated qualifications "Oculist, Physician", with his status listed as "Dead."

== Bibliography ==
- —— (1766). An Account of East-Florida (1st ed.).
- —— (1766). An Account of East-Florida (2nd ed.).
- —— (1769). A Description of East-Florida (3rd ed.). London: W. Nicoll and T. Jefferies.
