= 16th federal electoral district of Jalisco =

Federal electoral district of Mexico

Jalisco's 16th
- Electoral district of the Chamber of Deputies of Mexico

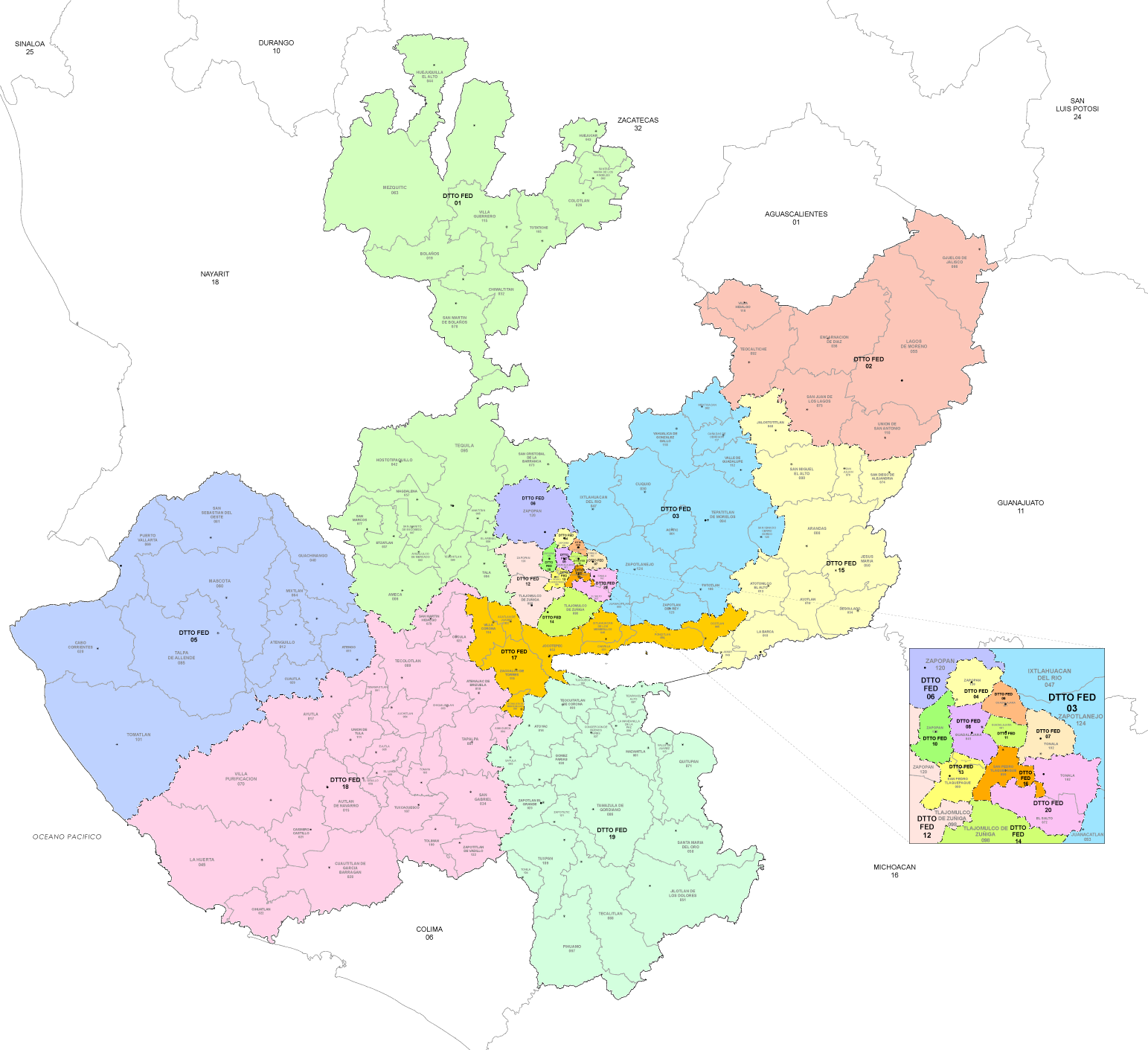
- 16th district

Incumbent
- Member: Alberto Maldonado Chavarín
- Party: ▌Morena
- Congress: 66th (2024–2027)

District
- State: Jalisco
- Head town: Tlaquepaque
- Coordinates: 20°37′N 103°19′W
- Covers: Municipality of Tlaquepaque (part)
- PR region: First
- Precincts: 125
- Population: 418,419 (2020 census)

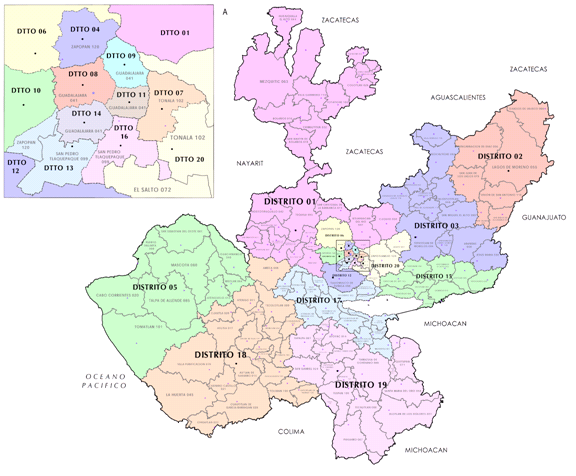
Jalisco's districts in 2017–2022

The 16th federal electoral district of Jalisco (Spanish: Distrito electoral federal 16 de Jalisco) is one of the 300 electoral districts into which Mexico is divided for elections to the federal Chamber of Deputies and one of 20 such districts in the state of Jalisco.

It elects one deputy to the lower house of Congress for each three-year legislative session by means of the first-past-the-post system. Votes cast in the district also count towards the calculation of proportional representation ("plurinominal") deputies elected from the first region.

Suspended in 1930, (Note: An amendment to Article 52 of the Constitution in 1928 changed the original provision of "one deputy per 60,000 inhabitants" to "one deputy per 100,000"; as a result, the size of the Chamber of Deputies fell from 281 in the 1928 election to 171 in 1934.) the 16th district was re-established as part of the 1977 electoral reforms. The restored district returned its first deputy in the 1979 mid-term election.

The current member for the district, elected in the 2024 general election, is Alberto Maldonado Chavarín of the National Regeneration Movement (Morena).

== District territory ==
Under the 2023 districting plan adopted by the National Electoral Institute (INE), which is to be used for the 2024, 2027 and 2030 federal elections, Jalisco's 16th district is located in the Guadalajara Metropolitan Area and comprises 125 electoral precincts (secciones electorales) in the east of the municipality of Tlaquepaque. (Note: The rest of Tlaquepaque (85 precincts) is assigned to the 13th district.)

The head town (cabecera distrital), where results from individual polling stations are gathered together and tallied, is the city of Tlaquepaque. The district reported a population of 418,419 in the 2020 census.

== Previous districting schemes ==
Evolution of electoral district numbers
	1974	1978	1996	2005	2017	2023
Jalisco	13	20	19	19	20	20
Chamber of Deputies	196	300				

2017–2022

Jalisco regained its 20th congressional seat in the 2017 redistricting process. The 16th district's head town was at Tlaquepaque and it covered 115 precincts in the east of that municipality.

2005–2017

Under the 2005 plan, Jalisco had 19 districts. This district's head town was at Tlaquepaque and it covered 130 precincts in the centre of the municipality.

1996–2005

In the 1996 scheme, under which Jalisco lost a single-member seat, the district had its head town at Tlaquepaque and it comprised the entire municipality.

1978–1996

The districting scheme in force from 1978 to 1996 was the result of the 1977 electoral reforms, which increased the number of single-member seats in the Chamber of Deputies from 196 to 300. Under that plan, Jalisco's seat allocation rose from 13 to 20. The restored 16th district's head town was at Guadalajara, the state capital, and it covered parts of the city's Libertad and Reforma sectors.

== Deputies returned to Congress ==
(Mexico) National parties
- Current
- PAN
- PRI
- PT
- PVEM
- MC
- Morena
- PAZ
- Somos
- Defunct or local only
- PLM
- PNR
- PRM
- PNM
- PP
- PPS
- PARM
- PFCRN
- CON
- PANAL
- PSD
- PES
- PES
- PRD

Jalisco's 16th district
Election	Deputy	Party	Term	Legislature
1916	Joaquín Aguirre Berlanga		1916–1917	Constituent Congress of Querétaro
...
The 16th district was suspended between 1930 and 1979
1979	Carlos Rivera Aceves	Institutional Revolutionary Party	1979–1982	51st Congress
1982	Héctor Alfredo Ixtláhuac Gaspar	Institutional Revolutionary Party	1982–1985	52nd Congress
1985	Antonio Brambila Meda	Institutional Revolutionary Party	1985–1988	53rd Congress
1988	Jesús Óscar Navarro Gárate	Institutional Revolutionary Party	1988–1991	54th Congress
1991	María Esther Scherman Leaño	Institutional Revolutionary Party	1991–1994	55th Congress
1994	José Iñiguez Cervantes	National Action Party (Mexico)	1994–1997	56th Congress
1997	José Antonio Álvarez Hernández	National Action Party (Mexico)	1997–2000	57th Congress
2000	José Bañales Castro (Note: Bañales Castro sat as an independent after 18 March 2003.)	Party of the Democratic Revolution Independent politician	2000–2003	58th Congress
2003	David Hernández Pérez	Institutional Revolutionary Party	2003–2006	59th Congress
2006	Francisco Javier Plascencia Alonso	National Action Party (Mexico)	2006–2009	60th Congress
2009	David Hernández Pérez	Institutional Revolutionary Party	2009–2012	61st Congress
2012	Luis Armando Córdova Díaz	Institutional Revolutionary Party	2012–2015	62nd Congress
2015	Germán Ernesto Ralis Cumplido	Citizens' Movement (Mexico)	2015–2018	63rd Congress
2018	Laura Pérez Segura	National Regeneration Movement	2018–2021	64th Congress
2021	Laura Pérez Segura	National Regeneration Movement	2021–2024	65th Congress
2024	Alberto Maldonado Chavarín	National Regeneration Movement	2024–2027	66th Congress

== Presidential elections ==
Jalisco's 16th district
Election	District won by	Party or coalition	%
2018	Andrés Manuel López Obrador	Juntos Haremos Historia	46.9767
2024	Claudia Sheinbaum Pardo	Sigamos Haciendo Historia	50.9347
