= José Castro (disambiguation) =

José Castro (1808–1860) was a native governor of Alta California.

José Castro may also refer to:

- José Ribeiro e Castro (born 1957), Portuguese politician
- José Castro (baseball) (born 1958), professional baseball coach
- José Castro (fencer) (born 1928), Portuguese Olympic fencer
- José Castro (footballer) (born 2001), Chilean football player
- José Castro (sport shooter) (1906–1965), Brazilian Olympic shooter
- José Castro (water polo) (1915–?), Uruguayan Olympic water polo player
- José Antonio Castro (born 1980), Mexican football player
- José Bañales Castro (born 1960), Mexican politician
- José Alberto Castro (born 1963), Mexican producer and director
- José de Castro (1868–1929), Portuguese lawyer, journalist and politician
- José García Castro (1933–2003), known as Pepillo, Spanish football player
- José Gregorio Castro (1859–1924), Peruvian prelate and former bishop of Cuzco
- José María Castro Madriz, Costa Rican lawyer, academic, diplomat, and politician
- José Miguel Castro, Chilean politician
