= David Hernández Pérez =

Mexican politician (born 1960)

- Born: 30 March 1960 (age 66); Guadalajara, Jalisco, Mexico
- Education: University of Guadalajara
- Occupation: Politician
- Political party: PRI, Movimiento Ciudadano MC

David Hernández Pérez (born 30 March 1960) is a Mexican politician affiliated with the Movimiento Ciudadano (MC).

In the 2003 mid-terms, he was elected to the Chamber of Deputies to represent Jalisco's 16th district during the 59th session of Congress on the Institutional Revolutionary Party (PRI) ticket. He was re-elected for the same district, again as a member of the PRI, in the 2009 mid-terms.
