= Castro =

Castro may refer to:

== People ==
- Castro (surname), including a list of people with the name
  - Fidel Castro (1926–2016), former revolutionary leader of Cuba
  - Raúl Castro (born 1931), former first secretary of the Cuban Communist Party
- De Castro family, a Sephardic Jewish family of Portuguese, Spanish and Italian origin
- House of Castro, a Spanish noble family
- Duke of Castro, the title of several people
- Martín Castrogiovanni (born 1981), Argentine-born Italian rugby player nicknamed Castro
- Castro (Brazilian footballer) (Luiz Felipe Castro Neto, born 1995)
- Castro (Spanish footballer) (Santiago Castro Anido, born 1947)
- Castro (musician) (Theophilus Tagoe, born 1982, disappeared 2014), Ghanaian musician

== Places ==
=== Italy ===
- Castro, Apulia
- Castro, Lazio, an ancient city
- Castro, Lombardy
- Oschiri, site of Castro, a disappeared town, and bishopric

=== Spain ===
- Castro (Soria)
- Castro Caldelas, Galicia
- Castro Urdiales, Cantabria

=== United States ===
- Castro County, Texas
- Castro District, San Francisco, commonly referred to as the Castro
  - Castro station
- Castro Creek, in Richmond, California
- Castro Cove, of the San Pablo Bay in Richmond, California
- Castro Peak (California)
- Castro Valley, California

=== Elsewhere ===
- Castro, Paraná, Brazil
- Castro, Chile
- Castro, Ticino, Switzerland
- Castro Peak, in Antarctica

== Other uses ==
- Castro culture, Iron-Age, Bronze-Age and Celtic culture in the Northern Iberian Peninsula
  - Castros (Spain), fortified settlements
  - Castros in Portugal, fortified settlements
- Castro (clothing), an Israeli company
- Castro (play), a 1598 Portuguese tragedy play by António Ferreira
- "Castro" (song), by Yo Gotti, 2016
- Castro FC, Spanish football team
- Castro Theatre, in San Francisco, California, US

== See also ==
- Castro Barros (disambiguation)
- Castro Street (disambiguation)
- Castro City (disambiguation)
- Castor (disambiguation)
- Castro brothers (disambiguation)
- Castra and castrum, Latin terms for military camp and fort
- Gastro-, of or pertaining to the stomach
- Kastro (disambiguation)
- Roman Catholic Diocese of Castro (disambiguation)
- Wars of Castro, in the mid-17th century
