= Sergio de Castro =

Sergio de Castro may refer to:

- Sergio de Castro (economist) (1930–2024), Chilean economist who served the military junta headed by Augusto Pinochet as economy and finance minister
- Sergio de Castro (artist) (1922–2012), French-Argentinian artist

== See also ==
- Sergio Castro, Mexican humanitarian
