= Duke of Castro =

Duke of Castro or Duchess of Castro may refer to:

- As reigning dukes, rulers of the Duchy of Castro of the House of Farnese (1537–1649):
  - Pier Luigi Farnese, 1st Duke of Castro from 1537 to 1545 (1503–1547)
  - Ottavio Farnese, 2nd Duke of Castro from 1537 to 1545 (1545–1547)
  - Orazio Farnese, 3rd Duke of Castro from 1547 to 1553 (1547–1553)
  - Ottavio Farnese, 4th Duke of Castro from 1553 to 1586 (1524–1586)
  - Alexander Farnese, 5th Duke of Castro from 1586 to 1592 (1545–1592)
  - Ranuccio I Farnese, 6th Duke of Castro from 1592 to 1622 (1569–1622)
  - Odoardo Farnese, 7th Duke of Castro from 1622 to 1646 (1612–1646)
  - Ranuccio II Farnese, 8th Duke of Castro from 1646 to 1649 (1630–1694)
- As titular dukes, heads of the House of Bourbon-Two Sicilies (1861–present):
  - Francis II, King of the Two Sicilies from 1859 to 1861, and Duke of Castro from 1861 to 1894 (1836–1894)
  - Prince Alfonso of Bourbon-Two Sicilies, Duke of Castro from 1894 to 1934 (1841–1934)
  - Prince Ferdinand Pius of Bourbon-Two Sicilies, Duke of Castro from 1934 to 1960 (1869–1960)
  - Prince Ranieri of Bourbon-Two Sicilies, Duke of Castro from 1960 to 1973 (1883–1973)
  - Prince Ferdinand Maria of Bourbon-Two Sicilies, Duke of Castro from 1973 to 2008 (1926–2008)
  - Prince Carlo of Bourbon-Two Sicilies, Duke of Castro from 2008 to present (born 1963)

== See also ==
- Duchy of Castro
- House of Castro
- Castro (surname)
- Castro (disambiguation)
