= Luís Castro =

Luís Castro may refer to:

== Sports ==
=== Association football (soccer) ===
- Luis Castro (footballer, born 1921) (1921–2002), Uruguayan footballer
- Luis Castro (footballer, born 1957), Chilean footballer
- Luís Castro (footballer, born 1961), Portuguese football manager
- Sito (footballer, born 1980) (Luis Castro Hernández), Spanish footballer
- Luís Castro (Salvadoran footballer) (born 1981), Salvadoran goalkeeper
- Luis Castro (footballer, born 2002), Spanish footballer
- Luís Castro (football manager, born 1980), Portuguese football manager

=== Other sports ===
- Lou Castro (Luís Miguel Castro, 1876–1941), Colombian Major League Baseball player
- Luis Castro (Negro leagues) (1905–?), Cuban baseball player
- Luis Castro (athlete) (born 1991), Puerto Rican high jumper

== Others ==
- José Luis Castro Medellín (1938–2020), Mexican bishop
- Luis Alva Castro (born 1942), Peruvian politician
- Luis Castro Leiva (1943–1999), Venezuelan political philosopher, writer and academic
- Luis Castro (TV producer and documentary director) (born 1973), Venezuelan-British TV producer and director
- Luis Carlos Barragán Castro (born 1988), Colombian science fiction writer and illustrator
- Luis John Castro (born 1982), Chamorro-American politician
