= Castro Barros =

Castro Barros may refer to:

- Castro Barros (Buenos Aires Underground), station of line A of the Buenos Aires metro
- Castro Barros (La Rioja), municipality in La Rioja
- Pedro Ignacio de Castro Barros (1777–1849), Argentine priest, member of the Congress of Tucuman
