= List of things named after Fidel Castro =

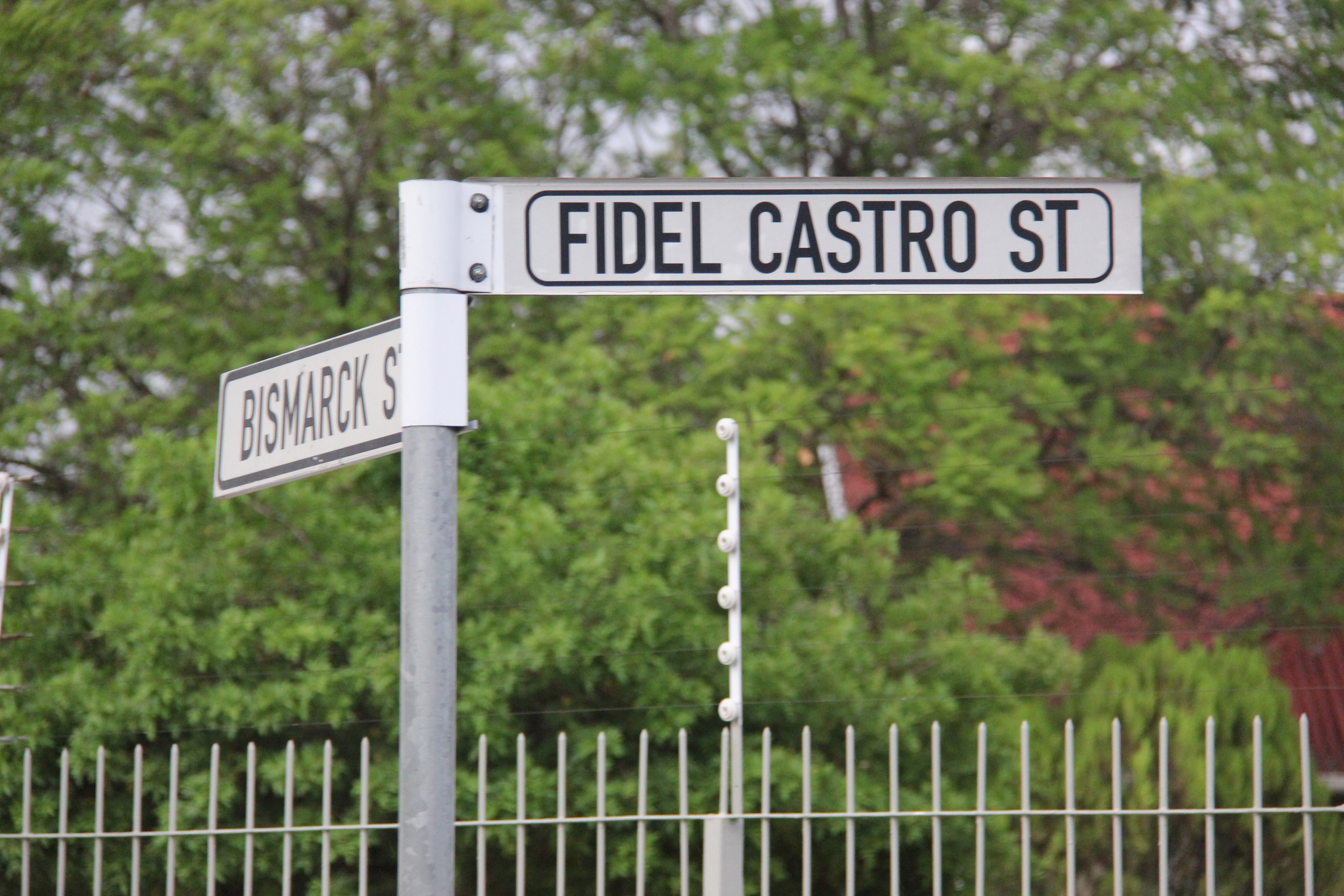
Fidel Castro St., Windhoek.

Fidel Alejandro Castro Ruz (August 13, 1926 – November 25, 2016) was the leader of Cuba from 1959 to 2006. He led the Cuban Revolution which overthrew the government of Fulgencio Batista.

== In Cuba ==
Because Castro chose not to create a cult of personality, inside Cuba there are no streets, buildings, institutions or localities named for him. There are no official photos of Castro. In 1959 the Italian sculptor Enzo Gallo Chiapardi made a bust of Castro, but Castro ordered that it be destroyed. In a speech on the International Workers' Day of 2003, Castro noted: "There is no cult of personality around any living revolutionary, in the form of statues, official photographs, or the names of streets or institutions. The leaders of this country are human beings, not gods." Following Fidel Castro's death, the Cuban government announced that it would be passing a law prohibiting the naming of "institutions, streets, parks or other public sites, or erecting busts, statues or other forms of tribute" in honor of the late Cuban leader in keeping with his wishes to prevent the development of a cult of personality.

== Outside Cuba ==
The only things named in honor of Fidel Castro are located outside Cuba:

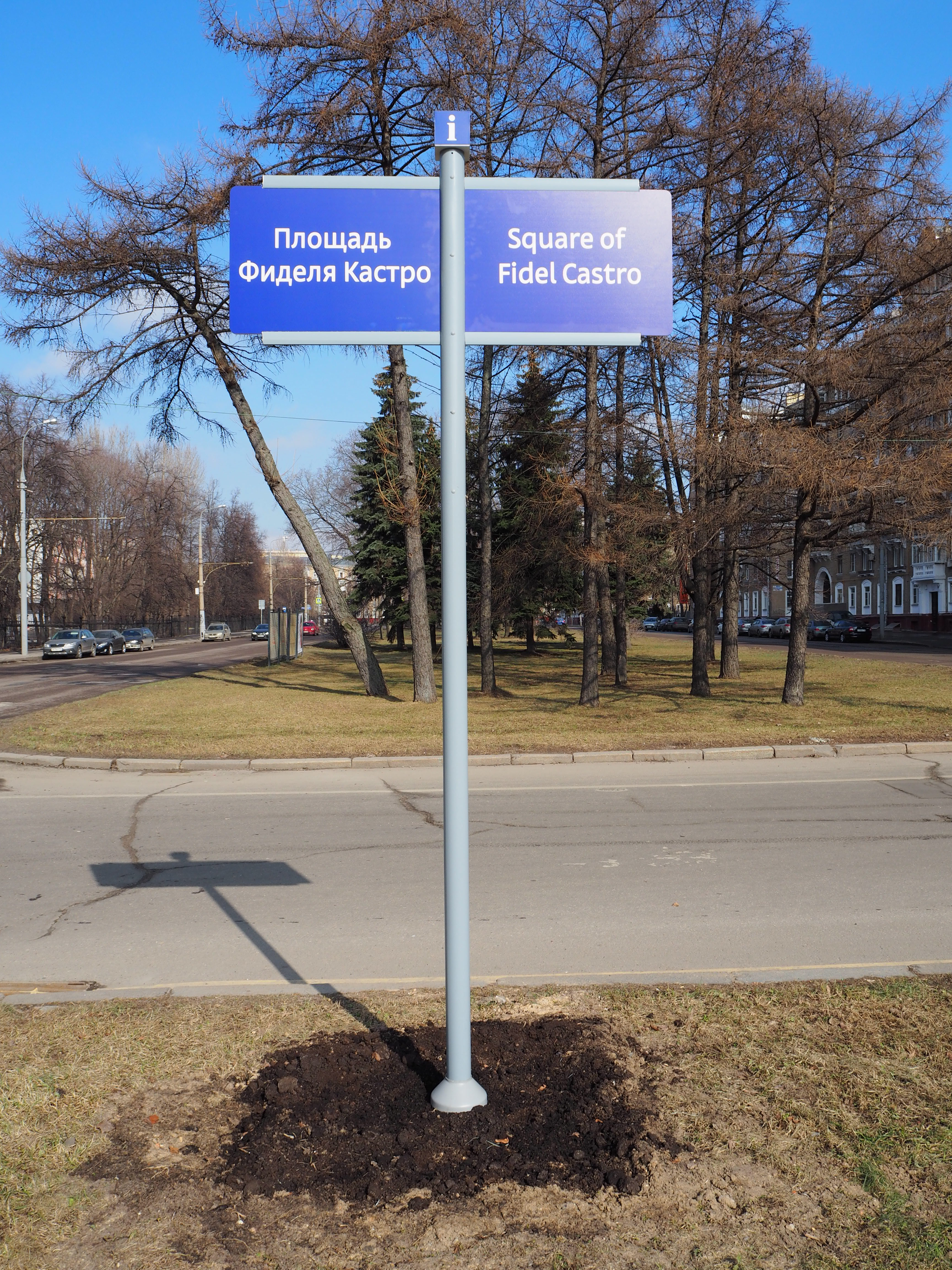
Square of Fidel Castro, Moscow.

- Fidel Castro Park (Dong Ha, Quang Tri, Vietnam);
- Fidel Castro Street (Pretoria, South Africa);
- Fidel Castro Street (Cape Town, South Africa);
- Fidel Castro Street (Ladysmith, South Africa);
- Fidel Castro Street (Klerksdorp, South Africa);
- Fidel Castro Ruz House (of Department of Health of Limpopo, South Africa);
- Fidel Castro Building (the tallest in Bloemfontein, houses the provincial administration, and is also known as "The Pride of the Free State");
- Fidel Castro Street (Conakry, Guinea);
- Fidel Castro Street (Windhoek, Namibia);
- Fidel Castro School (Windhoek, Namibia);
- Fidel Castro Secondary School (Wawi, Tanzania);
- Escola Fidel Castro (Tombwa, Angola);
- Escola Primária Nº 5001 Fidel Castro (Viana, Angola);
- Escola Primária Fidel Castro (Xai-Xai, Mozambique);
- Campus Fidel Castro (Montpelier, Jamaica);
- Avenida Comandante Fidel Castro (Luanda, Angola);
- Square of Fidel Castro (Moscow, Russia).

== See also ==
- Fidel Castro Smith (born 1963), British boxer named after Cuban Fidel Castro.
