= Fidel Castro Secondary School =

Coordinates: 5.237974°S 39.81126°E

Fidel Castro Secondary School is a secondary school located in Wawi village in the district of Chake-Chake on Pemba Island in Tanzania. It was built in 1963 under Sultanate of Zanzibar and by that time was known as Sayyid Khalifa Secondary School to Honour The 9th sultan of Zanzibar Sir Seyyid Khalifa bin Haroub Al-busaidy. It was later changed to Fidel Castro Secondary School after Zanzibar Revolution that threw the sultan and led to People's Republic of Zanzibar.

The school was once the only secondary school with students from Form 1 to Form 3 in all the districts of Pemba. Form 4 was introduced and eliminated the need for students who graduate there to go to Lumumba Secondary School for Form 4 and A level studies. Later on the school was further expanded to include A level which further eliminated the need for students to go to Lumumba Secondary School in Unguja. The Fidel Castro Secondary School remained the only high school on Pemba Island until recently when other high schools were opened in Pemba. Though it still remain the only high school in Pemba which offer science subjects. It is one of three secondary schools in Zanzibar offering advanced secondary education.

In 2009, US Embassy Chargé d'affaires Larry André donated 500 textbooks to the school on the behalf of the US Government.

== Notable alumni ==
- Ali Khamis Seif, member of the National Assembly of Tanzania, attended the school.
- Hemed Suleiman Abdalla 2nd Vice President of Zanzibar.

== See also ==
- List of things named after Fidel Castro
