= William Chester =

William Chester may refer to:

- William Chester (bishop) (died 1893), Church of Ireland bishop and author
- Sir William Chester (mayor) (1509–1595?), Lord Mayor of London
- Sir William Chester, Baronet of the Chester baronets
- William Chester (MP for Derby), see Derby
- William Chester (MP for Bristol), see Bristol
- William Chester, American pathologist, see Erdheim-Chester disease
