= Fernando Ruiz de Castro (disambiguation) =

Fernando Ruiz de Castro (died 1377) was a Galician nobleman.

Fernando Ruiz de Castro or the variation Fernando Rodríguez de Castro may also refer to:

- Fernando Rodríguez de Castro (1125–1185), Castilian nobleman
- Fernando Rodríguez de Castro (died 1304), Galician nobleman
- Fernando Ruiz de Castro y Portugal (1505–1575), mayordomo mayor
- Fernando Ruiz de Castro Andrade y Portugal (1548–1601), viceroy of Naples

== See also ==
- de Castro
- Castro (disambiguation)
- Fernando Castro (disambiguation)
