= Luis Armando Córdova Díaz =

Mexican politician (1968–2025)

- Born: 30 December 1968; Jalisco, Mexico
- Died: 13 May 2025 (aged 56); Zapopan, Jalisco, Mexico
- Education: University of Guadalajara
- Occupation: Politician
- Political party: PRI

Luis Armando Córdova Díaz (30 December 1968 – 13 May 2025) was a Mexican politician affiliated with the Institutional Revolutionary Party (PRI).

Córdova Díaz served in the Congress of Jalisco from 2010 to 2012. In the 2012 general election he was elected to the Chamber of Deputies to represent Jalisco's 16th district during the 62nd session of Congress.

Córdova Díaz was assassinated on 13 May 2025 inside a Starbucks in the Valle Real neighborhood of Zapopan, Jalisco. He was 56. The suspect was apprehended, captured and then arrested by the Federal Police and the Army which then took the suspect into custody and charged of Córdova's murder.
