= Nelson Castro =

Nelson Castro may refer to:

- Nelson Castro (politician) (born 1972), member of the New York State Assembly
- Nelson Castro (weightlifter) (born 1974), former Olympian from Colombia
- Nelson Castro (journalist) (born 1955), Argentine journalist, doctor and writer
- Nélson Oliveira (born 1991), Portuguese footballer, full name Nelson Castro Oliveira
