= Marco Castro =

Makeup artist and Film Director

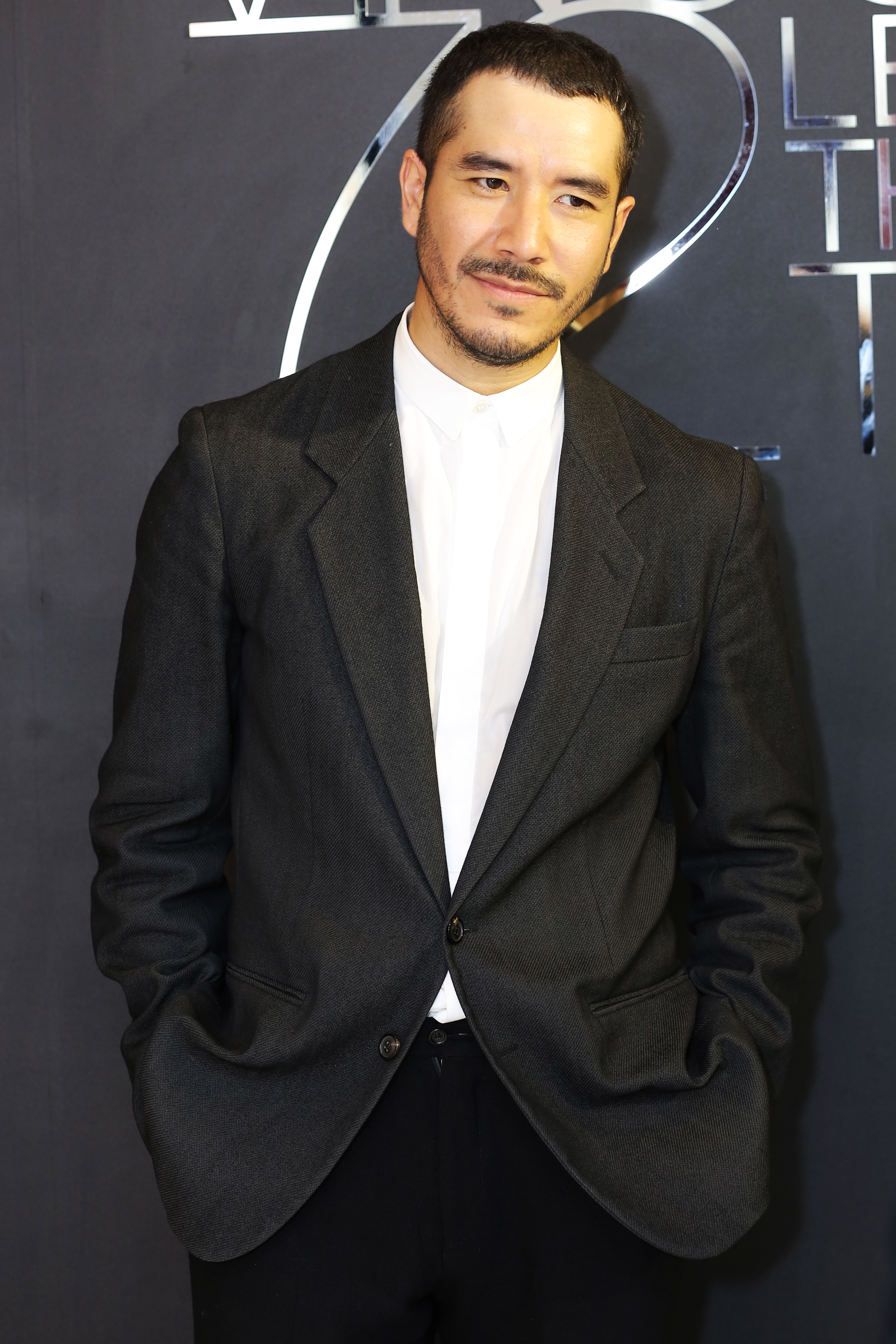
- Marco Castro
- Born: November 30, 1980 (age 45); Lima, Peru
- Occupations: Makeup Artist, Film Director, Entrepreneur
- Years active: 1999–present
- Notable work: Comunidad, To be an American, We, Mexicans, Manuela
- Website: https://marcocastro.world

Marco Castro (born November 30, 1980) is a Peruvian make-up artist, film director, and entrepreneur.

Castro has worked in the beauty and fashion industries for over a two decades, and started under the tutelage of François Nars, He is the founder and creative director of his eponymous beauty brand. Castro has worked with Cartier, Calvin Klein, and NARS Cosmetics. His work has appeared in fashion publications, such as i-D magazine, Document Journal, CR Fashion Book, Vogue, and W Magazine. He has also been part of fashion designer Willy Chavarria's creative team.

His films explore themes of diversity and immigration, and his documentary and fashion short films have been screened and nominated at the Palm Springs Film Festival, San Diego Latino Film Festival, Berlin Commercial, Milano Fashion Film Festival, and Malaga Film Festival.

== Filmography ==
- Comunidad (2021) Documentary fashion film
- To be an American (2020) Documentary fashion film
- We, Mexicans (2019) Docu-style fashion film for Showstudio
- Any Day Now (2016) Fashion Film for Elena Benarroch
- If I Hear You Talk Apostrophes Again (2012) (music video)
- Red Suite (2012) (fashion film)
- Marlowe (2010)
- Slice (2010)
- Radar The Son(s) (2010) (music video)
- Glen or Glenda (2007)
- Manuela (2006)
- Amar i yo (2006)
- Fanatica (2005)
- Oferta (2005)
- Sodomia (2004)
- El Amor (2003)
- La Lluvia (2003)

== See also ==
- List of famous Peruvian Directors
