= Plácido de Castro =

Plácido de Castro may refer to:

- José Plácido de Castro (1873–1908), Brazilian soldier and politician who led the revolt by which Acre became a state of Brazil
- Plácido de Castro, Acre, municipality in Acre, Brazil
- Plácido de Castro Futebol Club, football club in Acre, Brazil
