= Pedro Fernández de Castro (disambiguation) =

Pedro Fernández de Castro may refer to:

- Pedro Fernández de Castro (Grand Master of the Order of Santiago)
- Pedro Fernández de Castro (died 1214), Castilian nobleman
- Pedro Fernández de Castro (died 1342) was a Galician nobleman and military leader.
- Pedro Fernández de Castro, Count of Lemos, 17th-century nobleman
