= Joseph Castro =

Joseph or Joe Castro may refer to:

- Joseph H. De Castro (1844–1892), Medal of Honor recipient in the US Civil War
- Joe Castro (pianist) (1927–2009), American jazz pianist
- Joe Castro (filmmaker) (born 1970), writer and director of The Summer of Massacre
- Joseph I. Castro (1966–2025), former California State University chancellor
- Joseph Antequera y Castro, Panamanian lawyer and judge in Peru; insurrection leader
