= Castro Street =

Castro Street may refer to:

- Castro Street in the Castro District, San Francisco, California

- Castro Street Station, a Muni Metro underground station at the junction of Castro and Market streets in San Francisco
- Castro Street Fair, a street fair in the Castro neighborhood

- Castro Street, the main street of Mountain View, Santa Clara County, California
- Castro Street (film), a 1966 short documentary film directed by Bruce Baillie and set in Richmond, California
