= Daniel Castro =

Daniel Castro may refer to:

- Daniel Castro (baseball) (born 1992), Mexican professional baseball player
- Daniel Castro (archer) (born 1997), Spanish archer
- Daniel Castro (field hockey) (born 1937), Hong Kong field hockey player
- Daniel Castro (footballer) (born 1994), Chilean footballer
- Daniel Castro (BMX rider) (born 2002), Colombian BMX rider
