= Castro City =

Castro City may refer to:

- Castro City, Mountain View, California
- Castro, Lazio, Italy, Renaissance city razed in 1649
