= Raúl Castro (disambiguation) =

Raúl Castro (born 1931) is the former President of State Council of Cuba (2008–2018) and current First Secretary of the Communist Party of Cuba (2011–present).

Raúl Castro may also refer to:

- Raúl Héctor Castro (1916–2015), Mexican-American politician, Governor of Arizona (1974–1976), and US ambassador
- Raúl Castro (footballer) (born 1989), Bolivian footballer
- Raúl Castro Stagnaro (born 1952), Peruvian politician, president of the Christian People's Party
- Raúl Castro Vera, Peruvian politician, president of the Workers' Revolutionary Party
- Raúl Castro (water polo) (1920–1978), Uruguayan Olympic water polo player

== See also ==
- Raúl Castronovo (1949–2026), Argentine footballer
