= Ramón Castro =

Ramón Castro is the name of:

- Ramón Castro Ruz (1924–2016), figure in Cuban politics, and the brother of Fidel and Raúl Castro
- Ramón Castro (catcher) (born 1976), Puerto Rican professional baseball player
- Ramón Castro (third baseman) (born 1979), Venezuelan professional baseball player
- Ramón Castro Jijón (1915–1984), president of Ecuador
- Ramón Castro y Ramírez (1795–1867), Costa Rican politician
- Ramón Víctor Castro (born 1964), former Uruguayan footballer. Following his playing career, Castro became a football manager in Chile
