= Sebastian Castro =

Sebastian Castro may refer to:

- Sebastian Castro (American football) (born 2000), American professional football player
- Sebastian Castro (painter), 17th-century Flemish marine artist
- Sebastian Castro-Tello (born 1987), Swedish footballer
- Seb Castro (born 1989), American actor and singer
