= José Bañales Castro =

Mexican politician (born 1960)

- Born: 13 February 1960 (age 66); Jalisco, Mexico
- Occupation: Politician
- Political party: PRD, Independent

José Bañales Castro (born 13 February 1960) is a Mexican politician from the state of Jalisco.

In the 2000 general election, he was elected to the Chamber of Deputies to represent Jalisco's 16th district during the 58th session of Congress. Originally elected for the Party of the Democratic Revolution, he declared himself an independent on 18 March 2003.
