= Luis Castro (TV producer and documentary director) =

Venezuelan-British media entrepreneur, producer and director

Luis Oswaldo Castro Montero (born April 5, 1973) is a Venezuelan-British media entrepreneur based in London, and best known for his role as a director of the documentary Chávez, which was broadcast in several TV networks and awarded an Honorific Mention at the Havana Film Festival 2013.

He is a journalist with experience as a TV producer, presenter, director and head of Venispa Productions. His catalogue includes more than 200 productions, from TV documentaries, TV formats, news items and interviews broadcast by major international networks.

During his 20-year career he has travelled all over the world covering news, current affairs, business, eSports, art, and sports, from the UK to Venezuela, Colombia, Ecuador, Peru, Bolivia, Paraguay, Uruguay, Argentina, Brazil, Chile, Panama, Nicaragua, Costa Rica, Honduras, Guatemala, Cuba, Puerto Rico, Dominican Republic, México, Hawaii, USA, Spain, France, Iran and Russia among others.

== Life and career ==
Luis Castro was born in Caracas, Venezuela, on the 5th of April 1973.

Career ...

== Television ==
Luis created and produced a roundtable current affair TV series called Guayoyo, filmed in 12 countries in Latin America. and broadcast on the Iranian network HISPANTV.

He developed a docu-reality for the British network GinxTV focusing this time on eSports personalities. The series is called IRL had two seasons running on GinxTV.In 2014 he developed a docu-reality TV format called "Fuera del Area" that focuses on the real lives inside football, while expanding the same concept to the adult movie industry with a series called “Not so Private” hosted by the famous adult stars couple Jasmine Jae and Ryan Ryder.

Since 2017 he is the host and producer of the Latin-American affairs round table programmes “Cartas sobre la Mesa” broadcasting on RT en Español in which Luis debates with prominent politicians, academics and experts.

Luis is also an Interviewer for RT en español in which he had the chance to talk to important personalities like former president of Panama Ricardo Martinelli, salsa legend Oscar D’ Leon, Dominican legend singer Johnny Ventura, as well as other celebrities.

== Filmography ==
Title	Credit	Year
Occupy Wall Street	Producer	2012
Alabama HB56: La ilegal ley contra la inmigración ilegal	Producer	2012
Chile: Construyendo Sueños	Post-Production	2013
El arte islámico en Francia	Producer	2013
Islamofobia en Francia	Producer	2013
Mezquitas improvisadas en España	Producer	2013
Jornaleros en EE.UU.	Producer	2013
Los 5 de Cuba contra el Terrorismo	Producer	2013
Tráfico Humano y Esclavitud Moderna en EEUU	Producer	2013
La Salud Dental latina en California	Producer	2013
Muslims, Victims of Espionage in the USA	Director	2013
Asotrecol	Producer	2013
Chávez	Director	2013
Conchita contra la Guerra	Producer	2014
La Fotografía no es un Crimen	Producer	2014
La Ley que Justifica el Homicidio	Producer	2014
Hawaii The Stolen Paradise	Director	2014
Cartas sobre la Mesa	Director	2015
47Soul	Director	2015
Ngabe Struggle	Producer	2015
Ecuador the Poisoned rainforest	Producer	2015
Frack off, Power to the people	Producer	2015
Plan Andinia	Director	2015
The Great Game Expedition	Producer	2016
IRL (tv show)	Director and Producer	2016
Not So Private	Director and Producer	2016
Fuera del Area	Director and Producer	2016

== Awards ==
As a Documentary Director Luis Castro was awarded an "Honorable Mention of the Jury" at the 2013 Havana Film Festival for his film Chávez, a biography film on the life and death of the Venezuelan leader Hugo Chávez.
