= Carlos Castro (writer) =

Salvadoran novelist

Carlos Castro (born 1944 in Ahuachapán, El Salvador) is a Salvadoran novelist.

He was educated in Mexico at the Universidad Nacional Autónoma de México and has taught literature in both Mexico and El Salvador. He is the author of the historical novel El libro de los desvaríos, which won the first Certamen Centroamericano de Novela Salarrué in 1993.
