= Women At Work International =

- Formation: 2003
- Type: NGO
- Legal status: Organization
- Purpose: Fighting to end fistula and Reduce Commercial Sex Workers in East Africa
- Headquarters: Kampala, Uganda
- Location: Kampala, Uganda
- Region served: Uganda, Rwanda, Tanzania and Kenya
- Official language: English
- Website: Official website

Women At Work International (WAWI) is non profit organization located in Kampala, Uganda found by Halima Namakula. Since 2003 Women At Work International has been helping to empower children and women to claim equal rights, access to health services, education, economic and socio-cultural opportunities.

Women At Work International helps commercial sex workers off the streets by training them to also become peer educators with WAWI, while others abandon prostitution and learn how to make and sell necklaces, envelopes, candles and bracelets.

Women At Work International is the first organization to do a charity walk to support and help end fistula in Uganda. They also joined hands with Dr. Sherry Thomas and organized a team of US doctors to come to Uganda and provide free services to fistula victims.

== Partners ==
Women At work International partners are USAID, PACE, UHMG Uganda Marketing Group, ACET Uganda, British Council (Research on Islam in Uganda), Most at Risk Person Network (MARPS), and No End Entertainment.
