= Benjamin Castro =

Benjamin Castro may refer to:

- Benjamin Brian Castro (1989-), American actor and singer
- Benjamín de Arriba y Castro (1886–1973), Spanish Catholic cardinal
