= Oscar Castro =

Oscar Castro may refer to:

- Óscar Castro Zúñiga (1910–1947), Chilean poet
- Oscar Castro (chess player) (1953–2015), Colombian chess master
- Óscar Castro Ramírez (1947–2021), Chilean playwright, actor and director
- Oscar Castro-Neves (1940–2013), Brazilian guitarist
- Oscar Padula Castro (born 1993), Uruguayan footballer
