= Robert Chester =

Robert Chester may refer to:

- Robert Chester (lawyer), colonel in the US Marines and lawyer
- Robert of Chester, English Arabist of the 12th century
- Robert Chester (poet) (fl. 1601), English poet
- Robert I. Chester (1793–1892), Tennessee politician
- Bob Chester (1908–1977), American bandleader and tenor saxophonist
