= Alfredo Placencia =

Mexican priest and poet

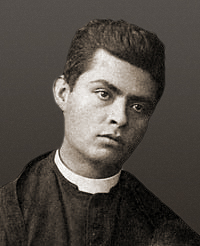
Alfredo Placencia

Alfredo Placencia (September 15, 1875 in Jalostotitlán - May 20, 1930 in Guadalajara) was a Mexican priest and poet. Known as Alfredo R. Placencia, his works include El libro de Dios (1924) (The Book of God), El paso del dolor (1924) (The Passing of Pain), Del cuartel y del claustro, y Poesías (1959) (Poems). His remains are in the Rotonda de los Hombres Ilustres, placed within the mausoleum of the Panteón de Belén.

== Bibliography ==
- Godoy, Luis Sandoval. Alfredo Plascencia. Dolor que canta, Taller Editorial La Casa del Mago, 2009.
- Gutiérrez Hermosillo, Alfonso. Antología poética, UNAM 1946.
- Vázquez Correa, Luis. Poesías, Casa de la Cultura Jalisciense, 1959
- Roman Plascencia, Alfredo. El libro de Dios, E. Subirana, 1924
