= Francisco Castro Trenti =

Francisco Castro Trenti is the former state's link between the state police of Baja California and Mexico's Attorney General, he is the former homicide division coordinator for the Baja California Attorney General's Office.

Francisco is the brother of Fernando Castro Trenti, one of the three state senators in the Congress of Mexico.
