= Jesús Castro =

Jesús Castro

- Jesús Castro-Balbi, French-American cellist
- Jesús Castro (Mexican footballer), Mexican unused reserve on Mexico's 1930 World Cup team
- Jesús Castro (Uruguayan footballer), Uruguayan footballer in 1957 Americas cup
- Jesús Castro, Puerto Rican bassist with Puerto Rican Power Orchestra
- Jesús Castro (actor) (1993), Spanish actor, star of El Niño
- Jesús Castro Agúndez (1906), Mexican politician
- Jesús Castro (Spanish footballer) (1951–1993), Spanish footballer
- Humberto Jesús Castro García (1957), Cuban painter
- Jesús Castro Romani (1983), Spanish basketball player
