= John Willie Chester =

Rugby league player

Personal information
- Full name: John Willie Chester

Playing information
- Position: Forward
Club
Years	Team	Pld	T	G	FG	P
1908–15	Warrington	153	24	1	0	74
Representative
Years	Team	Pld	T	G	FG	P
≥Sep 1908–≤Apr 15	Lancashire	2
- As of 13 December 2016

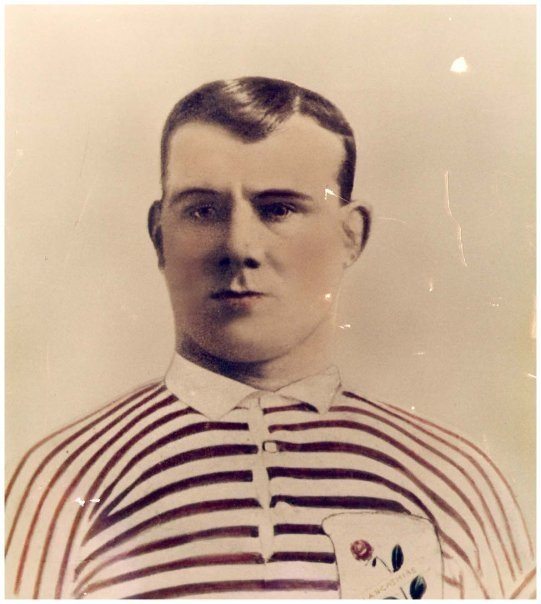
Portrait of John Willie Chester in his Lancashire Kit

John Willie Chester was a professional rugby league footballer who played in the 1900s and 1910s. He played at club level for Warrington, as a forward.

== Playing career ==
=== Challenge Cup Final appearances ===
John Willie Chester played in Warrington's 5-9 defeat by Huddersfield in the 1913 Challenge Cup Final during the 1912–13 season at Headingley Rugby Stadium, Leeds, in front of a crowd of 22,754.

=== Notable tour matches ===
John Willie Chester played as a forward in Warrington's 10-3 victory over Australia in the 1908–09 Kangaroo tour of Great Britain tour match during the 1908–09 season at Wilderspool Stadium, Warrington, Saturday 14 November 1908, in front of a crowd of 5,000, due to the strikes in the cotton mills, the attendance was badly affected, the loss of earnings meant that some fans could not afford to watch the first tour by the Australian rugby league team.

=== Club career ===
John Willie Chester made his début for Warrington on 19 September 1908, and he played his last match for Warrington on 5 April 1915.
