= Sir Charles Bagot Chester, 7th Baronet =

- Born: 1724
- Died: 1755 (aged 31)

Sir Charles Bagot Chester (1724 – 1755) was the 7th baronet Chester of Chicheley, Buckinghamshire.

== Early life and education ==
The son of Sir John Chester, 6th Baronet and Frances Bagot, Chester was born during 1724. He was educated at John Roysse's Free School in Abingdon, (now Abingdon School), Westminster School and later St John's College, Oxford. matriculated 4 November 1741.

== Career ==
He was awarded an honorary degree, (Doctor of Civil Law) on 14 April 1749.

== Peerage ==
He succeeded his father Sir John Chester, 6th Baronet, to the title on 8 February 1748. He was unmarried but had two children to mistresses. His will (dated 21 May 1755) was proven (by probate) on 27 May 1755. He was buried on 29 May 1755 at Chicheley, Buckinghamshire. The title went to his cousin Sir Francis Chester, 8th Baronet on his death.

Baronetage of England
Preceded by Sir John Chester, 6th Baronet	Chester baronets 1748–1755	Succeeded by Sir Francis Chester, 8th Baronet

== See also ==
- List of Old Abingdonians
