= Michael Castro =

Michael Castro may refer to:

- Michael Castro (footballer) (born 1989), Ecuadorian footballer
- Michael Castro (poet), U.S. poet and translator
