= Eddie Castro =

Eddie Castro may refer to:

- Eddie Castro (jockey) (born 1985)
- Eddie Castro (speedway rider) (born 1959)
