= Charles Chester (cricketer) =

English cricketer

Charles Chester (7 February 1869 – 9 February 1940) was an English cricketer who played for Derbyshire. He was born in Eastwood and died in Mansfield. Chester was a right-handed batsman and a right-arm medium-pace bowler.

Chester played in one match during the 1899 season against Marylebone Cricket Club, but was stumped in the first innings and bowled in the second, scoring a duck both times. When called up to bowl during the match, he took one wicket for nine runs.
