= Castro Barros, La Rioja =

Coordinates: 30°35′S 65°44′W

Castro Barros (La Rioja)
- Municipality and village
- Interactive map of Castro Barros (La Rioja)
- Country: Argentina
- Province: La Rioja Province
- Time zone: UTC−3 (ART)
- Climate: BSh

Castro Barros (La Rioja) is a municipality and village in La Rioja Province in northwestern Argentina.
