= Sergio Castro =

Mexican humanitarian

Sergio Castro Martínez
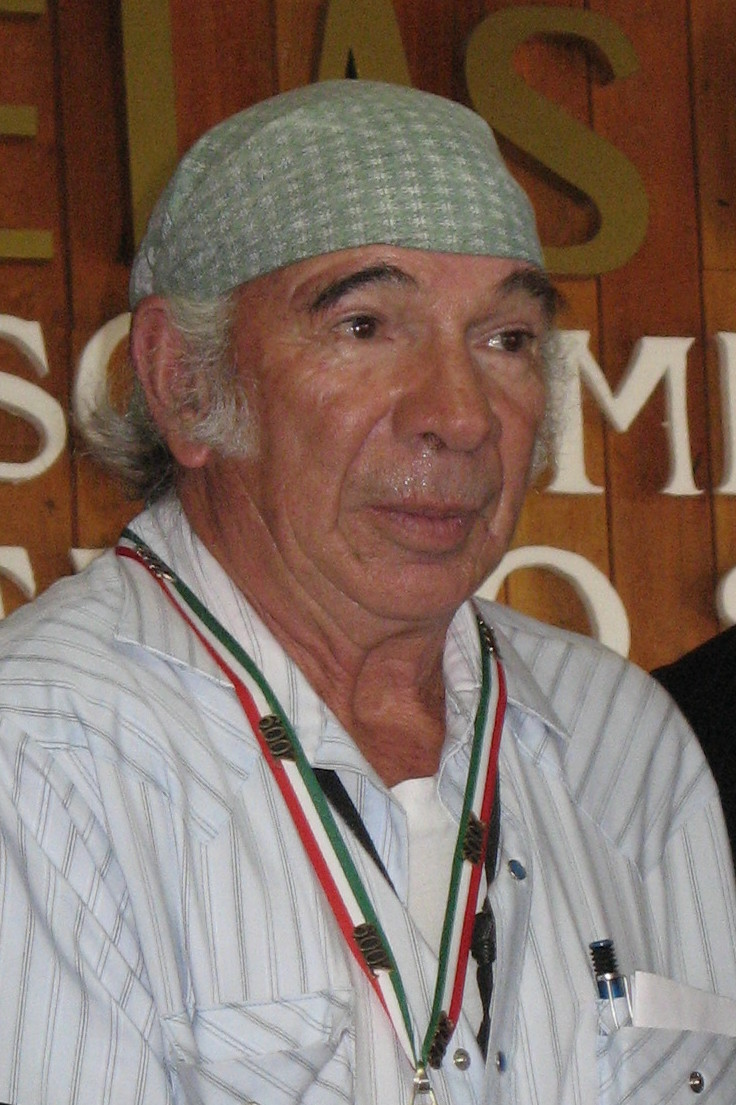
- Castro in 2009
- Born: Sergio Arturo Castro Martinez; 12 March 1941 (age 84); Delicias, Chihuahua, Mexico
- Occupation: Humanitarian
- Website: yokchij.org

Notes
- Museo de Trajes Regionales, #38 Guadalupe Victoria, San Cristóbal de las Casas, Chiapas

Sergio Arturo Castro Martínez (born 12 March 1941) is a Mexican humanitarian who resides in San Cristóbal de las Casas, Chiapas, Mexico.

He is by training an agricultural engineer, teacher and veterinarian. However, by nature he is a true humanitarian, ethnologist and polyglot (languages include Spanish, French, Italian, English, Tzotsil, Tzeltal and Mayan fluently). Castro has spent more than 45 years helping to build schools, develop water treatment systems and provide wound care for burn victims for the many indigenous cultures and Mexican people of Chiapas.

He travels daily to the surrounding indigenous villages and marginalized urban areas to care for the health and social development needs of the under served.

== Organizations ==
Yok Chij Association is his Mexican registered charitable organization. Castro has followers from around the world who support his efforts with monetary donations and supplies to treat his burn patients. He rarely receives payments from his patients. He has helped to build more than 35 schools and numerous water catchment and treatment systems in the San Cristóbal area and surrounding Maya villages.

Museo de Trajes Regionales – Over the years, for his service, Castro has been given tribal garb, statuettes, masks, tools, and decorative items from the villagers he has helped. He carefully displays these items in his museum at #38 Guadalupe Victoria in San Cristóbal de Las Casas, Chiapas, Mexico. The museum also serves as his daily walk-in clinic for the needy from 4-7pm, after which he personally gives tours to large and small groups. The tour includes a detailed review of the various tribal wear, people's customs and a slide show of the native Maya people.

Castro has received much recognition for his humanitarian efforts including the Medal of Merit Sancristobalense on 31 March 2009, presented to him by Municipal Council in a ceremony at the Municipal Palace.
