= Francisco Javier Plascencia Alonso =

Mexican politician

- Born: 10 January 1956 (age 70); Jalisco, Mexico
- Occupation: Politician
- Political party: PAN

Francisco Javier Plascencia Alonso (born 10 January 1956) is a Mexican politician affiliated with the National Action Party (PAN). In the 2006 general election, he was elected to the Chamber of Deputies to represent Jalisco's 16th district during the 60th session of Congress.
