= Comandante (book) =

Book by Rory Carroll

- First edition (UK)
- Author: Rory Carroll
- Language: English
- Genre: Non-fiction
- Publisher: Penguin Press, Canongate
- Publication date: March 2013

Comandante is a book about Hugo Chávez by the Irish journalist Rory Carroll first published in March 2013.

The book was published on 7 March 2013 — two days after the announcement of Chávez's death—by Penguin Press in the US and by Canongate in the UK. Translations are underway for editions in Brazil, China, Mexico, Spain, Italy, Estonia and Poland. It was named by Foreign Policy magazine as one of the 25 books to read in 2013.

John Sweeney in The Literary Review called the book "a well-considered and painfully fair epitaph" but said it was encumbered with respect for chavistas' aspirations. Oliver Balch in The Independent, considered that it "excels in showing what happens when a self-believing ideologue grasps the reins of government and determines not to let go."

The book was featured as BBC Radio 4's Book of the Week during March 2013.
