= Zulema Romero =

Spanish politician (born 2001)

Zulema Romero Sanz (born 2001) is a Spanish businesswoman and politician. Representing the People's Party (PP), she was elected to the Assembly of Extremadura in the 2025 election, in second place on the PP list in the Badajoz constituency.

== Biography ==
Sanz was born in Herrera del Duque in the Province of Badajoz. She graduated in advertising, public relations and tourism. She worked on the social media of Extremadura newspaper Hoy, as an events hostess, and as a shop assistant at Inditex. While studying in neighbouring Portugal, Romero received media attention in Spain for her TikTok videos outlining the differences between the two countries. After returning to her hometown of 3,400 inhabitants in 2025, she set up a business for events and wedding planning, and changed her online output to promoting Extremadura.

The President of the Regional Government of Extremadura, María Guardiola, called a snap election for December 2025. On the list of her People's Party (PP) in the Badajoz constituency, the party's regional secretary general Abel Bautista led the nomination, followed by Romero, in what was described by Cadena COPE as a surprise. She was elected as the 29 members from the PP formed the largest group in the Assembly of Extremadura.
