= Claudia Mabel Castro =

Chilean constituent

Claudia Castro
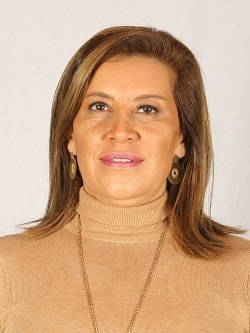

Member of the Constitutional Convention
- In office 4 July 2021 – 4 July 2022
- Constituency: 14th District

Personal details
- Born: 28 April 1968 (age 57) Santiago, Chile
- Occupation: Constituent

Claudia Mabel Castro Gutiérrez (born 28 April 1968) is a Chilean fashion designer and independent politician.

She was elected as a member of the Constitutional Convention in 2021, representing the 14th District of the Metropolitan Region of Santiago.

== Biography ==
Castro was born on 28 April 1968 in Santiago, Chile. She is the daughter of José Miguel Castro Torres and Rosa Marina Gutiérrez Rubio.

Castro completed her primary and secondary education at Instituto San Pablo Misionero in the commune of San Bernardo, graduating in 1987. She later studied fashion design at the Paulina Diard Technical Training Center.

She worked professionally as a fashion designer, merchant, and entrepreneur in the commune of San Bernardo.

== Political career ==
Castro is an independent politician.

In the elections held on 15–16 May 2021, she ran as a candidate for the Constitutional Convention representing the 14th District of the Metropolitan Region as an independent on a seat supported by the Independent Democratic Union, within the Vamos por Chile electoral pact.

She obtained 3,758 votes, corresponding to 1.24% of the valid votes cast, and entered the Convention through the gender parity mechanism.
