= Jason Castro =

Jason Castro may refer to:

- Jason Castro (singer) (born 1987), American singer-songwriter, contestant of TV show American Idol
  - Jason Castro (album), the self-titled debut studio album recorded by Jason Castro
- Jason Castro (baseball) (born 1987), American baseball player
- Jayson Castro (born 1986), Filipino basketball player
