= Chester baronets =

Extinct baronetcy in the Baronetage of England

The Chester Baronetcy of Chicheley, Buckinghamshire was created in the Baronetage of England on 23 March 1620 for Anthony Chester. He had in August 1577 inherited the Chicheley estates from his maternal grandmother and served as High Sheriff of Buckinghamshire in 1602 and High Sheriff of Bedfordshire in 1628.

== Chester baronets, of Chicheley (1620) ==
- Sir Anthony Chester, 1st Baronet (1566–1635)
- Sir Anthony Chester, 2nd Baronet (1593–1652)
- Sir Anthony Chester, 3rd Baronet (c 1633–1698), MP for Bedford 1685–1687
- Sir John Chester, 4th Baronet (1666–1726)
- Sir William Chester, 5th Baronet (1687–1726)
- Sir John Chester, 6th Baronet (1693–1748), MP for Bedfordshire 1741–1747
- Sir Charles Bagot Chester, 7th Baronet (1724–1755)
- Sir Francis Chester, 8th Baronet (1694–1766)
- Sir Anthony Chester, 9th Baronet (1706–1769), Baronetcy extinct 17 May 1769 on his death
