= Peter Chester =

English convicted murderer and activist

Peter Chester (born Peter Speakman 1954 in Blackpool, Lancashire) is an English convicted murderer and paedophile who launched a campaign for prisoners to be given the right to vote.

== Conviction ==
Chester, who was married and lived on Lytham Road, South Shore was convicted of raping and murdering his seven-year-old niece, Donna Marie Gillbanks, at the home of his sister June Gillbanks (née Speakman) in October 1977. He had fled the flat on Mickleden Road having left Donna Marie in her bed. She was discovered with strangle marks around her neck and the foam and blood in her mouth, by her mother the following morning after she had failed to get up.

He was found guilty of rape and murder at Chester Crown Court in March 1978 and sentenced to life imprisonment with a recommended minimum term of 20 years. However, he remains imprisoned more than 30 years after his conviction as Parole Board reports have stated that the risk he poses is still too high for him to be granted parole.

== Right to vote challenge ==
Chester launched his legal challenge to gain prisoners the right to vote in October 2009. Peter Chester took his case to the Court of Appeal which unanimously ruled to dismiss his case and also denied him permission to appeal in the Supreme Court.
