= Bernard Romans =

Dutch-American navigator and surveyor (1741–1784)

Bernard Romans (c. 1720–1784) was a Dutch-born navigator, surveyor, cartographer, naturalist, engineer, soldier, promoter, and writer who worked in the British American colonies and the United States. His best-known work, A Concise Natural History of East and West Florida, published in 1775, is a valuable source of information about the Floridas during the period of British control. His maps and charts are considered better than any produced before, and also for many years after, their publication.

== Biography ==
Romans was born Barend Romans in Delft, son of Pieter Barendsz Romans and Margareta van der Linden. He was raised and educated there, but emigrated to Great Britain as a youth or young man, and then to British North America around 1757, during the Seven Years' War, known as the French and Indian War in British North America.

On March 3, 1761, Romans married Maria Wendel (born 1739) at the Dutch Reformed Church in colonial Albany, New York. A son, Peter Milo Romans, was born in Albany on January 16, 1762, who would marry in 1785 in Albany and have ten children. There is no further record of Maria Wendel Romans, who may have died young. Romans remarried in 1779.

By his own account, in about 1761 Bernard Romans entered into the King's service as a commodore, "sometimes at the head of a large body of men in the woods, and at the worst of times ... master of a merchantman, fitted out in a warlike manner." After the war ended, Romans continued to go to sea. He sailed widely, both as a privateer during the war and as a merchant, reaching points as far north as Labrador, and as far south as Curaçao, Cartagena, and Panama. In 1774, Romans was elected to the American Philosophical Society.

== Travels in the Floridas ==
In 1766–67, he commanded the sloop Mary. On his first voyage, the ship went aground on the Dry Tortugas, but he was able to get the ship off and reach port. On his second voyage, the ship was lost near Cape Florida (Key Biscayne). Having lost much of his personal wealth with the wreck of the Mary, Romans turned to surveying. He obtained employment as deputy surveyor of Georgia. He also accepted private commissions to survey land grants in East Florida, which had come under British control at the end of the French and Indian War.

In 1768, Romans became principal deputy surveyor for the Southern District (the British Colonies of Virginia, North Carolina, South Carolina, Georgia, East Florida, and West Florida). Starting in 1769, Romans surveyed the coastal waters of East Florida. Later that year, his boat sank in the Manatee River near Tampa Bay. Romans walked overland from there to St. Augustine. Well aware of the historical significance of where he walked, he later wrote that he had been "on Ferdinando Soto's tract". He outfitted another boat, at his own expense, and resumed surveying the coast in September 1770. He reached Pensacola, Florida in August 1771, having recorded depth soundings, good harbours, and sources of fresh water, and drafted coastal charts for much of the East Florida coast.

Upon reaching Pensacola, Romans was hired to survey the western part of West Florida and the lands of the Choctaws and Chickasaws. The survey was not without its dangers; the Choctaws and the Creeks were at war. Rumours even reached Mobile that Romans and his party had been killed by Creeks. Roman's survey work in West Florida continued into 1772.

In Pensacola, a John Lorimer recruited Romans to explore for new plant specimens. Romans soon discovered what he believed to be true jalap, which was much in demand in Europe as a cathartic. Jalap had previously been available only from New Spain, and the prospect of a supply under British control pleased many in West Florida. It was later realized that Roman's jalap was not the Mexican jalap, but a relative in the family Convolvulaceae, probably Solanum jamesii. This "wild jalap" or "wild potato" was in the Pharmacopoeia of the United States from 1820 until 1863. Romans pursued his botanizing enthusiastically, collecting many plant specimens and seeds, and began seeking support for a plan to establish a botanical garden in West Florida.

== Publishing A Concise Natural History of East and West Florida ==
In early 1773, Romans left West Florida to travel to the northern colonies. He wanted to publish his nautical charts and navigational instructions, along with material on the natural history of the Floridas that he had gathered in his surveys. He also took rare seeds and plant specimens he had collected. His ship was "over-set at sea", and the seeds and plant specimens were lost or ruined. His navigational charts and the manuscript of the book he was writing on the natural history of the Floridas were saved.

Romans was now planning an ambitious book of some 300 pages with copper plate engravings and two large maps of the Floridas and the Caribbean. He needed to find financial backers and sign up subscribers to meet the costs of publishing the book. This effort led him into many new contacts. In August 1773, Romans was admitted into the Marine Society of the City of New York. In January 1774, he was elected a member of the American Philosophical Society. A paper by Romans on an improved sea compass was published in the society's Transactions, and he presented descriptions of new plants he found in Florida to the society. Although no longer resident in West Florida, Romans had also been appointed botanist for West Florida.

During this time, Romans proposed to William Legge, 2nd Earl of Dartmouth, Secretary of State for the Colonies and President of the Board of Trade and Foreign Plantations, an expedition to the northeastern parts of Asia. Romans gave more details of his scheme to Hugh Williamson, a fellow member of the American Philosophical Society. To Williamson, Romans expounded his plan for an expedition to explore the Mississippi River basin and the Great Lakes, then moving westward to the Pacific coast. From there, the expedition would cross the Pacific Ocean to Asia, and travel through Russia, eventually reaching Great Britain. This was thirty years before President Thomas Jefferson commissioned the Lewis and Clark Expedition, and almost twenty years before Alexander MacKenzie's crossing of the Canadian Arctic.

Romans continued to work to get his book published. Romans had originally conceived his book as a guide to mariners, and one-quarter of his subscribers were involved in shipping. But Romans was also receiving questions from people who were interested in moving to the Floridas, and Romans expanded his book to accommodate them. From the originally planned 300 pages, the book grew to about 800 pages, and it had to be split into two volumes. Romans promised his subscribers that the second volume would be forwarded to them at no additional charge (the first volume had to be printed and sent off before the presses could be set up for the second volume). Romans placed ads in many newspapers, and travelled extensively seeking subscribers to the book. Romans had selected James Rivington, publisher of Rivington's New-York Gazetteer, to be his printer, and engaged Paul Revere to engrave most of the plates for the book. Romans also collaborated with Paul Revere on other projects, including the map that accompanied Rivington's printing of John Hawkesworth's book on the voyages of James Cook.

The first volume of A Concise Natural History of East and West Florida was finally ready for delivery in late April 1775. Romans announced in Rivington's New-York Gazetteer that his subscribers should tell him where to deliver the books. Romans's announcement was published eight days after the Battles of Lexington and Concord. A second printing of the volume was required in 1776 to fulfil all subscriptions.

== Revolutionary War activities ==
Romans' sympathies with the Revolution had developed before his book was published. He had appeared before the Boston Marine Society on December 1, 1773, and was in the city when the Boston Tea Party occurred. In his book, Romans described tea as a despicable weed, and of late attempted to be made a dirty conduit, to lead a stream of oppressions into these happy regions. In early April 1775, Romans was appointed a captain by the Connecticut Committee of Safety, with a charge to take Fort Ticonderoga and nearby British fortifications. He was given £100 with which to raise troops. Within a few days, Romans had over 200 men with him. While Benedict Arnold and Nathanael Greene took command of the large body of troops headed for Fort Ticonderoga, Romans' company was sent to capture Fort George on Lake George, a neglected post which surrendered without a fight. Romans went on to Ticonderoga, where he helped assess the ammunition that had been captured. Benedict Arnold reported favourably on Romans as an engineer after this service.

Romans soon returned to Connecticut. It is not known if Romans was present at the Battle of Bunker Hill, but he published an illustration of it, An Exact View of the Late Battle at Charlestown, June 17, 1775. Romans also published a map of the area around Boston, The Seat of Civil War in America, and dedicated it to John Hancock. Romans' earlier work was also used by the British in their maps, particularly in A General Map of the Southern British Colonies, which was included in the American Military Pocket Atlas, intended for the use of mounted British officers.

In New York, James Rivington had proved to be too neutral in his coverage of the growing conflict between the colonies and Britain, and, in November 1775, a mob of patriots destroyed his print shop. The second volume of Romans' book was in production at the time and was lost.

Later, in 1775, the Continental Congress recommended Romans to the New York Commissioners for Fortifications in the Highlands to oversee the construction of a fort at Martelaer's Rock, across the Hudson River from West Point. Romans set to work surveying the river and designing fortifications. When the commissioners inspected the site, they were unhappy both with Romans' plans and with the site, which was exposed to the superior positions available across the river on West Point. Romans went to New York City and presented his plans to the Committee of Safety without mentioning the doubts expressed by the Commissioners. The Committee of Safety forwarded Romans' plan and expenses to the Continental Congress and, according to Romans, promised him that he would be appointed principal engineer for New York with the rank and pay of a Colonel.

A struggle ensued for control of the project between Romans and the Commissioners for Fortifications in the Highlands. Romans proceeded with much of the work, but eventually went to Philadelphia to report and seek support. While Romans appeared to win approval from the Congress, it was generally recognized that his work had not been very fruitful. In George Washington's words, Romans's fortifications were "very neat" and "very picturesque" but "upon the whole, Mr. Romans has displayed his genius at a very great expense and to very little publick advantage."

Romans was next given a commission as captain of the First Pennsylvania Company of Artillery, which soon joined the campaign against Quebec. After the Americans were defeated in Quebec, Romans's company was reassigned, in July 1776, to Fort Ticonderoga. Shortly after, General Horatio Gates sent Romans to investigate the preparations being made under the direction of Major General Philip Schuyler to defend Lake Champlain against the expected British invasion. Romans was shocked by the sight of the vessels being prepared for the lake fleet, but was unable to do anything. This fleet was soon defeated at the Battle of Valcour Island. Fortunately for the Americans, the battle had also been costly for the British, and they delayed their invasion southwards.

In November 1776, the Pennsylvania Council of Safety appointed Romans Engineer and ordered that he be furnished with the means to conduct an experiment in "destroying distant objects by fire." Unfortunately, there is no further record of this experiment. Romans also continued to produce maps, including two of Connecticut, one centred on Philadelphia, including most of New Jersey and Delaware, and portions of Maryland and Pennsylvania, showing the location of the Grand American Winter Camp 1778 at Valley Forge, and a map of the Northern Department of North America.

Romans resigned his commission on June 1, 1778. He continued working on a history of the oppression of the Netherlands by the British. By the end of 1778, he had finished the two-volume Annals of the Troubles in the Netherlands, and the first volume was in bookstores in January 1779. The second volume did not appear until 1782.

On January 28, 1779, Romans married Elizabeth Whiting of Wethersfield, Connecticut, who was just 19 years old. A son, Hubertus Romans, was born on October 23, 1779.

Romans joined the Southern Campaign in 1780. It is not clear what Romans's assignment was, but an application for a pension filed by Elizabeth Romans in 1848 states that Romans "was ordered to go to the State of South Carolina, there to join the Southern Army". The ship on which Romans was travelling from New London, Connecticut, to Charleston, South Carolina, was captured by the Royal Navy. Romans was held prisoner until the war ended. He died aboard ship while returning home. Both his widow, Elizabeth Whiting, and at least one early historian believed that Romans had been murdered on the voyage.

== Bibliography ==
- Bonar, William, and Bernard Romans. 1757. A draught of the upper Creek nation, taken in May 1757. Shows upper Creek villages near Fort Toulouse, particularly along the Coosa and Tallapoosa Rivers. Gives number of fighting men and towns. Similar to "A draught of the Creek nation by William Bonar, May 1757" in the British Colonial Office. Map possibly drawn by Bernard Romans.
- Guthorn, Peter J. 1966. American Maps and Map Makers of the Revolution. Monmouth Beach, NJ: Philip Freneau Press.
