= Zulema Castro de Peña =

Argentine activist

Zulema Castro de Peña (c. 1920 – 22 January 2013) was an Argentine human rights activist and member of the Mothers of the Plaza de Mayo. Her two sons, Jesús Peña and Isidoro, disappeared during Dirty War of the 1970s, leading to her lifelong campaign for human rights and answers for the relatives of the "disappeared."

Castro's son, Jesús Peña, a member and militant of the Workers' Revolutionary Party (PRT), a Marxist political party, was kidnapped in La Plata, Argentina, on June 26, 1978. Her younger son, Isidoro, disappeared in Buenos Aires on July 10, 1978, just days after his older brother. The disappearance of her sons led Zulema Castro de Peña to campaign for answers for decades. She became a prominent human rights activist within the Mothers of the Plaza de Mayo, an association for Argentine mothers whose children disappeared during the dictatorship and Dirty War. Forensic anthropologists determined that both of her sons had been killed in an investigation finally conducted in 1997. In 2012, the city of La Plata installed two "Baldosas por la Memoria", or Tiles For Memory, in remembrance of her sons and other "disappeared" from the city. Zulema Castro de Peña's husband, Isidoro Peña, also founded la Asamblea Permanente por los Derechos Humanos en La Plata, a human rights group in La Plata.

Zulema Castro de Peña, a longtime resident of La Plata, died in the city on January 22, 2013, at the age of 92.
