= Wawi =

Wawi วาวี
- Tambon
- Country: Thailand
- Province: Chiang Rai
- Amphoe: Mae Suai

Population (2018)
  - Total: 25,476
- Time zone: UTC+7 (TST)
- Postal code: 57180
- TIS 1099: 571006

Wawi (Thai: วาวี, pronounced [wāːwīː]) is a tambon (subdistrict) of Mae Suai District, in Chiang Rai Province, Thailand. In 2018 it had a total population of 25,476 people.

== History ==
The subdistrict was created effective September 15, 1979 by splitting off 10 administrative villages from Mae Suai.

== Administration ==
=== Central administration ===
The tambon is subdivided into 27 administrative villages (muban).

No.	Name	Thai
1.	Ban Wawi	บ้านวาวี
2.	Ban Pa Kio	บ้านปางกิ่ว
3.	Ban Doi Chang	บ้านดอยช้าง
4.	Ban Doi Lan	บ้านดอยล้าน
5.	Ban Huai Masang	บ้านห้วยมะซาง
6.	Ban Huai Pu	บ้านห้วยปู
7.	Ban Thung Phrao	บ้านทุ่งพร้าว
8.	Ban Thung Phrao	บ้านทุ่งพร้าว
9.	Ban Huai Khilek Kao	บ้านห้วยขี้เหล็กเก่า
10.	Ban Saen Charoen Kao	บ้านแสนเจริญเก่า
11.	Ban Huai Nam Yen	บ้านห้วยน้ำเย็น
12.	Ban Pong Klang Nam	บ้านโป่งกลางน้ำ
13.	Ban Huai Khrai	บ้านห้วยไคร้
14.	Ban Khu Suai	บ้านขุสรวย
15.	Ban Mae Mo Yao	บ้านแม่โมงเย้า
16.	Ban Ya Nam	บ้านย่านำ
17.	Ban Pha Daeng Luang	บ้านผาแดงหลวง
18.	Ban Huai Kla	บ้านห้วยกล้า
19.	Ban Chuchi	บ้านจู้จี้
20.	Ban Lao Li	บ้านเลาลี
21.	Ban Huai Nam Un	บ้านห้วยน้ำอุ่น
22.	Ban Mang Kala	บ้านมังกาล่า
23.	Ban Pang Kuseng	บ้านปางกู่เส็ง
24.	Ban Pang Klang	บ้านปางกลาง
25.	Ban Mai Phatthana	บ้านใหม่พัฒนา
26.	Ban Doi Chang Lisu	บ้านดอยช้างลีซู
27.	Ban Doi Chang Mai	บ้านดอยช้างใหม่

=== Local administration ===
The whole area of the subdistrict is covered by the subdistrict administrative organization (SAO) Wawi (องค์การบริหารส่วนตำบลวาวี).
