= Ioannis Dimakopoulos =

Greek Army officer

Second Lieutnenant Ioannis Dimakopoulos
- Ιωάννης Δημακόπουλος
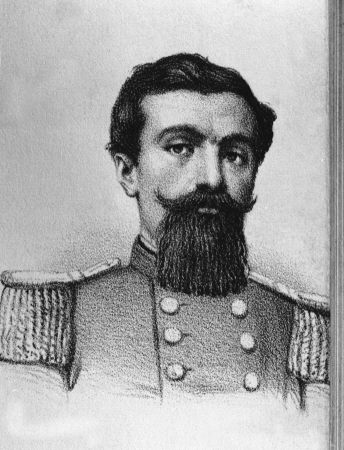
- Ioannis Dimakopoulos c. 1868
- Born: 10 January 1833 or 20 March 1835; Vytina, Kingdom of Greece
- Died: 9 November 1866; Arkadi Monastery, Crete, Ottoman Empire (now Greece)
- Relatives: Konstantinos Dimakopoulos (father); Eleni Dimakopoulou (mother)
- Military career
- Allegiance: Kingdom of Greece
- Branch: Hellenic Army; Cretan Revolutionaries
- Commands: Commander of Arkadi Monastery
- Conflicts: Crimean War: Thessaly Revolt of 1854; Cretan revolt (1866–1869): Siege of Arkadi Monastery †

Ioannis Dimakopoulos (Greek: Ιωάννης Δημακόπουλος, 1833/35–1866) was an officer of the Hellenic Army from Arcadia. He participated as a volunteer in the Cretan Revolution of 1866 and he was killed during the siege of Arkadi Monastery.

== Biography ==
Ioannis Dimakopoulos was born in Vytina of Arcadia on 10 January 1833, or, according to another theory, on 20 March 1835. He was the son of Konstantinos Dimakopoulos, fighter of the Greek War of Independence and later officer of the Hellenic Army. His mother's name was Eleni.

After finishing high school he fought as a volunteer in 1854 in the Revolution of Thessaly during the Crimean War. On 16 January 1856, he enlisted as a volunteer in the army and on 18 January 1863 he was promoted to the rank of second lieutenant. Shortly before the outbreak of the Cretan Revolution of 1866 he served as adjutant under the command of Gennaios Kolokotronis.

During 1866, Dimakopoulos went to Crete along with other officers, under the command of colonel Panos Koronaios. They disembarked at Bali of Mylopotamos on 24 September. A few days later, he was appointed by Koronaios commander of Arkadi Monastery and leader of a small force of forty men, who had come to Crete as volunteers from the mainland Greece. On 6 November, a powerful force of Ottoman troops encircled the monastery, while the number of the defenders were about 250–300 men. Two days later began the hostilities that led to the fall of the monastery on 9 November.

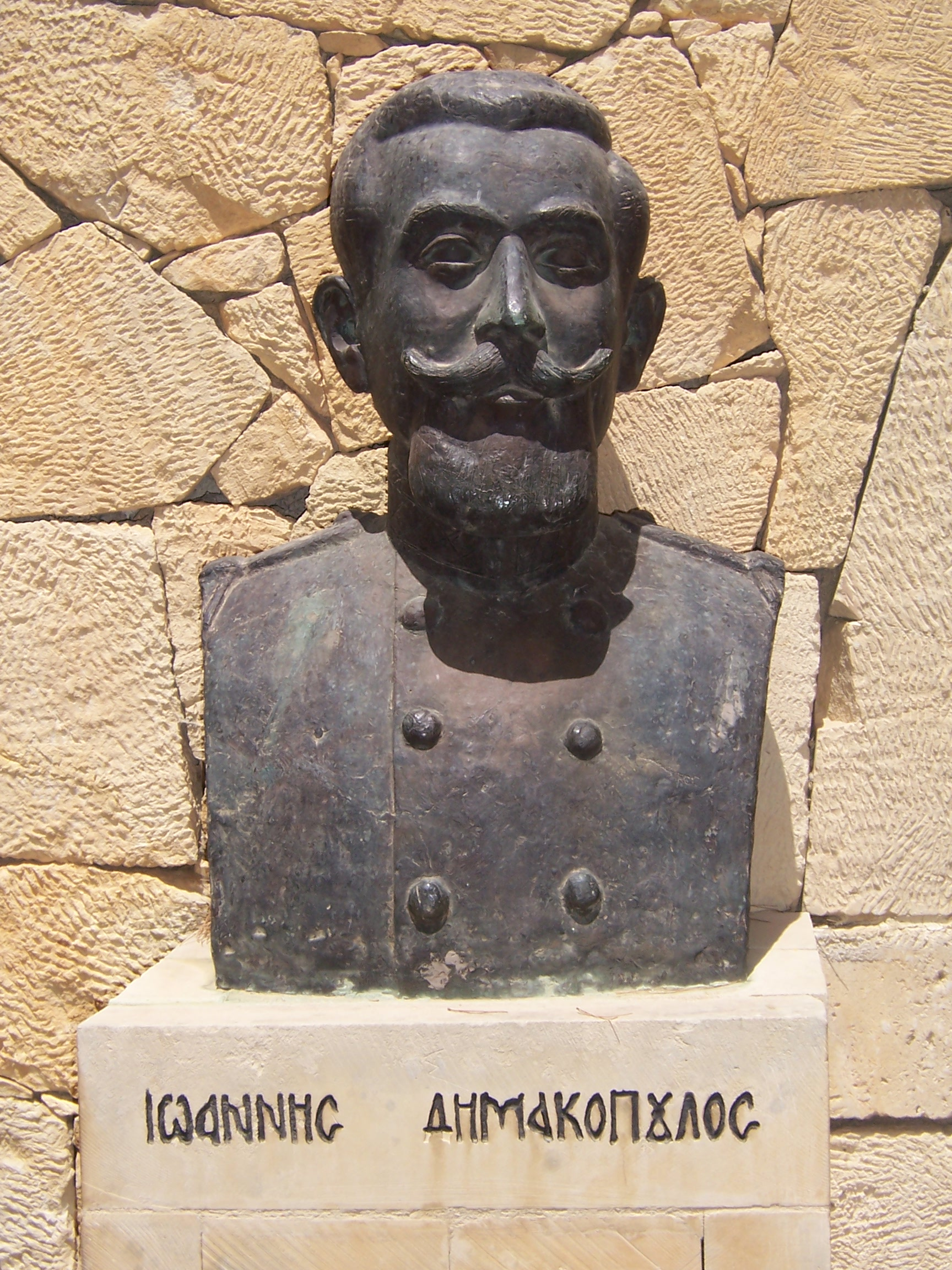
The bust of Ioannis Dimakopoulos in the courtyard of Arkadi Monastery.

Some of the survivors said that Dimakopoulos continued to fight on with some men after the explosion of gunpowder that led to the siege of Arkadi, but that eventually on the same day he was caught as a prisoner and speared to death. According to another theory, Dimakopoulos was killed by the deadly blast.

== Bibliography ==
- Karolos E. Moraitis, Ιωάννης Δημακόπουλος (1833–1866) – Ο ηρωικός φρούραρχος της Ιεράς Μονής Αρκαδίου, εκδόσεις Πελασγός, 2007
- Nikolas S. Psychas, Επαναστατική εικών των Δυτικών της Κρήτης διαμερισμάτων, ή ανασκευή χωρίων τινών της περιγραφουσης τον Εθνικόν Αγώνα της Κρήτης κατά των Τούρκων. πραγματείας του καθηγητού Μενδελσώνος Βαρθόλδου, Αθήνησι 1870.
- Magazine Νέα Εστία, 1 November 1966, vol. 944, p. 1494.
