= Henry McIver =

American mercenary

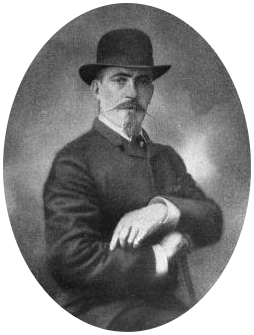
- Born: c. 1841; Virginia, United States
- Died: 1907
- Military career
- Allegiance: Britain; Italy; Don Carlos; Confederate States of America; Second Mexican Empire; Kingdom of Greece; Serbia
- Branch: East India Company; Confederate States Army
- Conflicts: Indian Rebellion of 1857; Expedition of the Thousand; Second Carlist War; American Civil War; Second French intervention in Mexico; Cretan revolt (1866–1869); Russo-Turkish War (1877–1878)

Henry Douglas McIver (c. 1841–1907) was an American mercenary who fought for 18 countries during the nineteenth-century.

== Early life ==
McIver was born in about 1841. He spent first ten years of his life in Virginia, United States, and then he was sent to his uncle, General Donald Graham, to finish school and prepare for West Point. Instead of West Point, McIver joined the private army of the East India Company when he was only 16 years old.

== Career ==
He was sent to India in 1858. At that time, the Sepoy Mutiny raged in India and during battle, McIver was seriously wounded by a tulmar blow to his skull.

In 1860, McIver fought under Giuseppe Garibaldi in Italy, and after that joined the pretender for the Spanish crown, Don Carlos.

When the American Civil War broke out, Henry McIver joined the Confederate side. Although he was only 20 years old at the time he was already an experienced soldier. While fighting for the Confederates, he was under the command of three famous Confederate generals: Jackson, Stewart and Smith. He was wounded in the Second Battle of Bull Run in August 1862.

At the end of the war, he allegedly challenged a Union officer, Major Tomlin, to a duel, which he won, running Tomlin through the body. When the Confederacy capitulated, McIver fled to Mexico, where he joined Emperor Maximilian in fighting Juárez’s rebels.

In Mexico he was captured by Indians, and escaped three months later by swimming across the Rio Grande. He fought at Monterrey, and for his deeds received the title of count. When the Juárez rebellion was successful, Maximilian was executed, and McIver fled to Tampico, where he boarded a ship and left for South America.

McIver later sought to fight for Greece against the Turks alongside Bennet Burleigh in the Great Cretan Revolution of 1866–1869. Richard Harding Davis reports:

On his return to Glasgow, MacIver foregathered with an old friend, Bennett Burleigh, whom he had known when Burleigh was a lieutenant in the navy of the Confederate States. Although today known as a distinguished war correspondent, in those days Burleigh was something of a soldier of fortune himself, and was organizing an expedition to assist the Cretan insurgents against the Turks. Between the two men it was arranged that MacIver should precede the expedition to Crete and prepare for its arrival. The Cretans received him gladly, and from the provisional government he received a commission in which he was given “full power to make war on land and sea against the enemies of Crete, and particularly against the Sultan of Turkey and the Turkish forces, and to burn, destroy, or capture any vessel bearing the Turkish flag.”

McIver then went to Athens and was given the role to fight against brigands alongside Colonel Panos Koronaios in Thessaly, which he did. Those brigands were recruited and directed by the Turks, who permitted them to enter Greece without disturbance, and on their return afforded them protection. McIver was later recommended for the highest Greek decoration for his service.

In the War of 1877-1878, McIver offered his services to the Serbians, initially being commissioned a colonel of volunteers and later rising to the rank of general and overall cavalry commander of the Serbian contingents.

In 1883, McIver organized a company for British colonization of New Guinea; the project had to be abandoned in 1884 after failing to gain the approval of the Earl of Derby.

== Death ==
McIver died in 1907.

== Sources ==
- L'Estrange, W. D. (1884). Under fourteen flags; the life and adventures of brigadier-general MacIver, Volume 1. London: Tinsley Brothers.
- Davis, Richard Harding (1906). Real Soldiers of Fortune. New York: C. Scribner's Sons.
