= Vrontisi Monastery =

Greek Orthodox monastery in Crete, Greece

- Μονή Βροντισίου
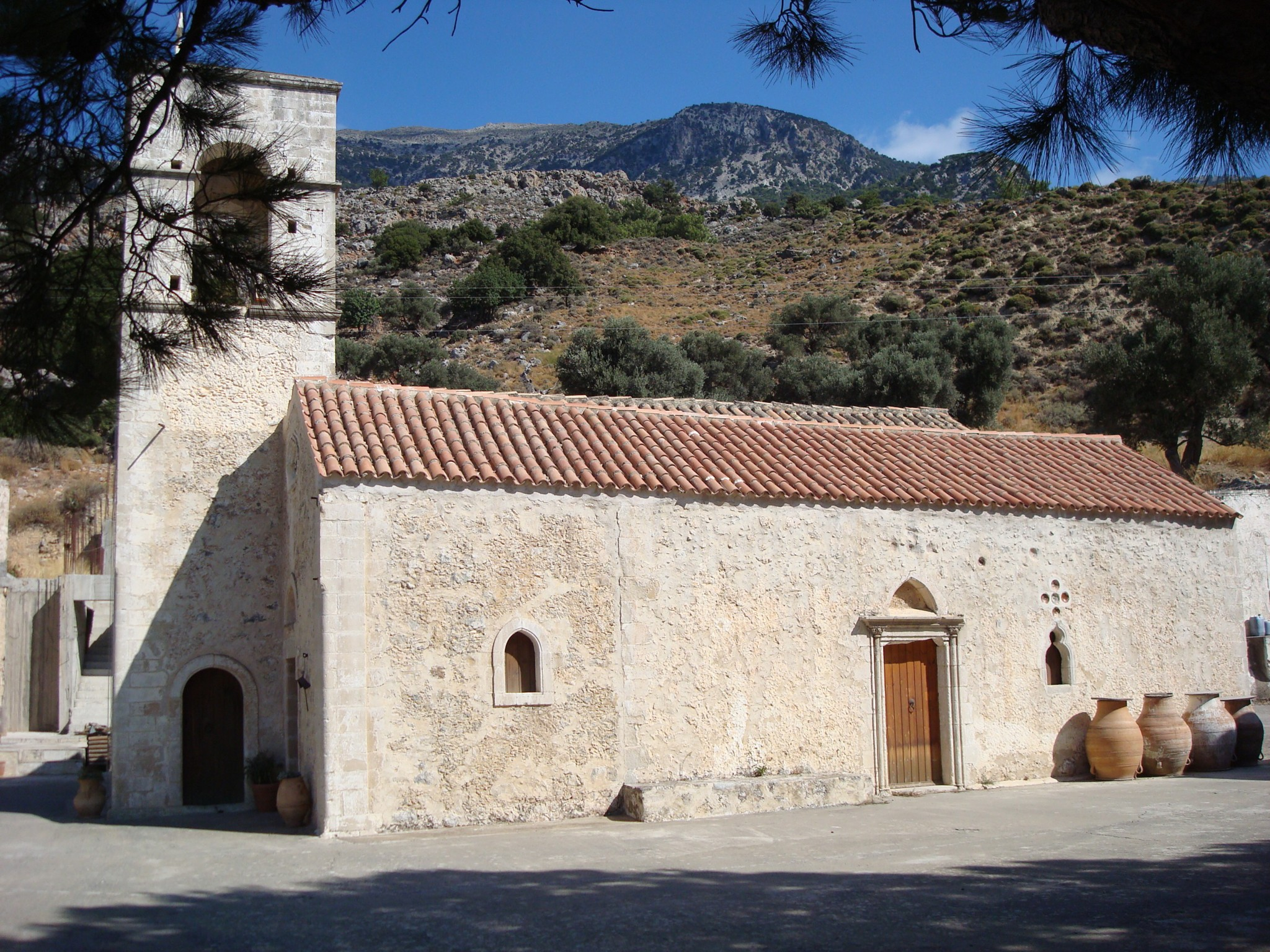
- View of the St. Anthony church

- Location of the monastery in Crete
- Interactive map of Vrontisi Monastery

Monastery information
- Order: Ecumenical Patriarchate of Constantinople
- Denomination: Greek Orthodox
- Dedication: St. Anthony
- Archdiocese: Church of Crete

People
- Founder: Vrontisis
- Important associated figures: Michael Damaskinos (monk artist); Michael Korakas (revolutionary)

Architecture
- Status: Monastery
- Functional status: Active
- Style: Byzantine
- Completion date: 14th century

Site
- Location: Mt. Ida, Heraklion, Crete
- Country: Greece
- Coordinates: 35°8′37″N 24°52′15″E

The Vrontisi Monastery (Greek: Μονή Βροντισίου (Note: Also spelled as Βροντησίου.)) is a Greek Orthodox monastery situated between the villages of Zaros and Vorizia of the Heraklion region in south-central Crete, Greece. The monastery is approximately 50 kilometres (31 mi) southwest of Heraklion, situated on the south slopes of Mt. Ida at 550 metres (1,800 ft) above sea level. From the monastery, there are panoramic views of the Mesara Plain and the Asterousia Mountains. The origin of its name is not clear; according to the prevailing explanation it was named after its founder whose surname was Vrontisis.

== History ==
Venetian archives contain several documents referring to the Vrontisi Monastery. The earliest written reference dates from 1474. However, it is older than that but the exact year of its establishment is unknown.

The Vrontisi Monastery was established as a metochion of the nearby Varsamonerou Monastery. The former fell into decline after 1500 whereas Vrontisi began to flourish and reached its apogee as a regional monastic and spiritual centre during the 16th and 17th centuries. After the fall of Crete to the Turks, the Arkadi Monastery was deserted and its monks fled to the Vrontisi Monastery. According to tradition, Michael Damaskinos, the renowned painter of the Cretan School, is believed to have served as a monk at the Vrontisi Monastery. Six of Damaskinos' best known icons were kept at the monastery until 1800 and are nowadays displayed at the St. Catherine of Sinai museum in Heraklion.

Owing to its fortified position, the Vrontisi Monastery was used as a revolutionary centre during the Cretan uprisings of the 19th century. During the great Cretan revolt of 1866, Michael Korakas used the monastery as his headquarters. In reprisal, the Ottomans slaughtered the monks and burned all crops, which resulted in the monastery being deserted and most of its heirlooms destroyed. During the German occupation of 1941–44, the Vrontisi Monastery provided shelter to resistance fighters.

The Vrontisi Monastery continues to be active. Despite having lost a significant part of its former glory due to the demolition of its fortifications, it continues to be an imposing sight.

== Architecture ==
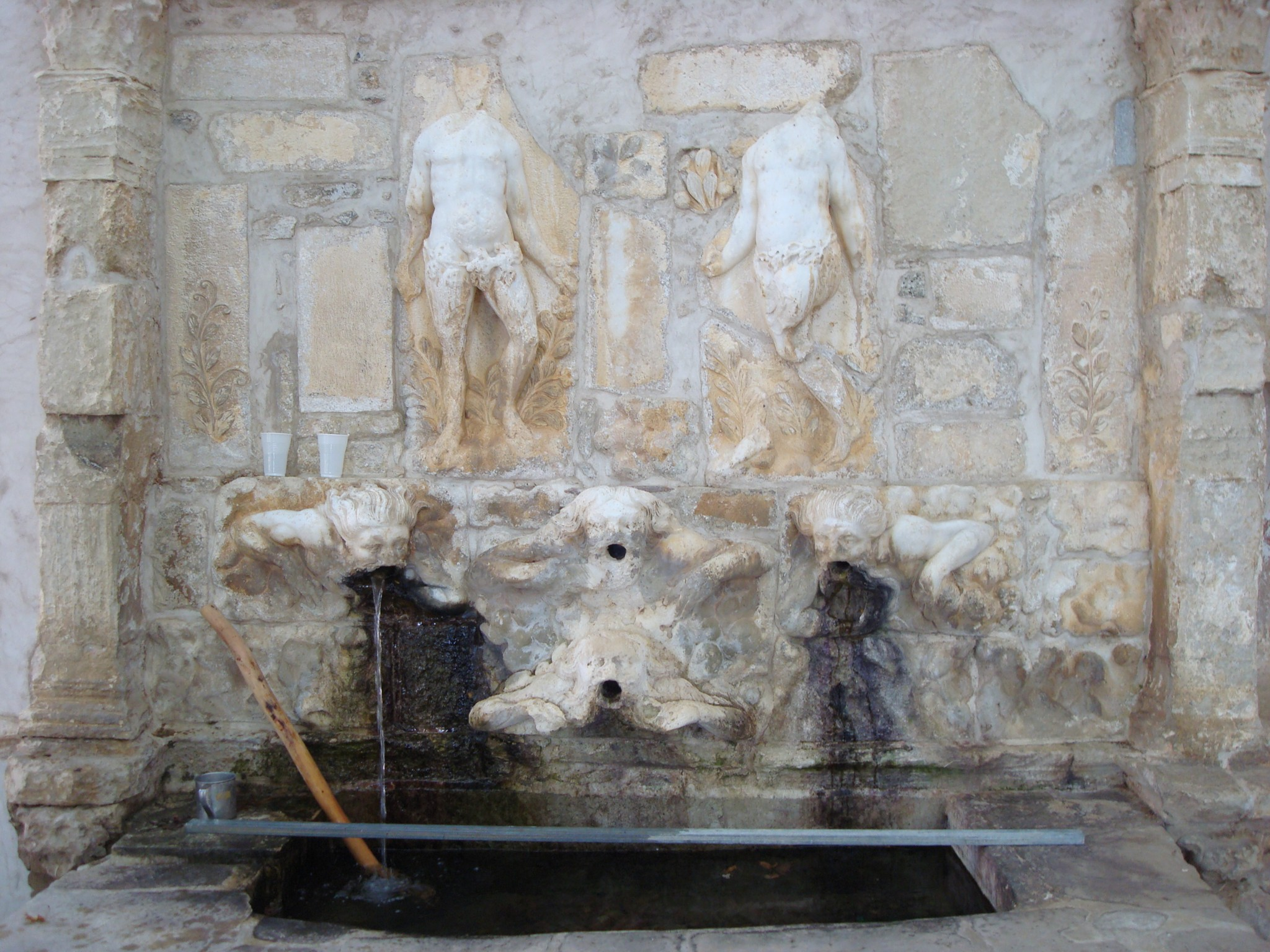
The fountain at the entrance of the monastery.

Similarly to most monasteries built during the Venetian period, the monastery used to be heavily fortified and surrounded by thick walls. However, only parts of the west wall remain today. In the middle of the court stands a two-nave church (katholikon) dedicated to St. Anthony (Antonios) and St. Thomas. The church was painted with frescoes of which very few remain in the southern nave. An arched bell tower of Italian influence rises besides the church. At the main entrance of the monastery there is a marble fountain dating to the Venetian era, featuring Adam, Eve and four faces from which the water flows that symbolize the four rivers of the Garden of Eden. Ottoman Turks used to call the Vrontisi Monastery in Turkish: Santrivanli Monastir, lit. 'Fountain Monastery'. According to the Italian architect Giuseppe Gerola, the fountain dates from the 15th century and was created by an artisan that could skilfully use the chisel, something that was uncommon in Crete at the time.

== See also ==
- Church of Crete
- List of Greek Orthodox monasteries in Greece
