= Korakas =

Korakas (Greek: Κόρακας, "raven") can refer to:

- Korakas Peak, the highest peak of Mount Vardousia in Central Greece
- Michail Korakas (1797–1884), Cretan revolutionary leader
- Aristotelis Korakas (1858–), Greek general
