= Adam Robertson =

Adam Robertson may refer to:

- Adam Robertson, musician with the Australian rock band Magic Dirt
- Adam Robertson (American politician), American politician
- Adam Robertson (Canadian politician) (died 1882), foundry owner and politician in Ontario, Canada
