= Bennet Burleigh =

Scottish pirate and Confederate spy during the American Civil War

Bennet Graham Burley
- Born: c. 1840
- Died: June 17, 1914 (aged 73–74)
- Military career
- Allegiance: (Italy) Redshirts; Confederate States of America; Kingdom of Greece
- Conflicts: Expedition of the Thousand; American Civil War; Cretan revolt (1866–1869)

Bennet Graham Burley (c. 1840 – June 17, 1914) was a Scottish-born pirate, Confederate spy and journalist. Later in life, he changed his surname to Burleigh and became a celebrated war correspondent for London's The Daily Telegraph.

== Biography ==
Born in Glasgow, he joined the British Legion of Giuseppe Garibaldi at the age of 20 and took part in the Expedition of the Thousand. After returning to the United States, he began work as a shipping clerk. Shortly afterwards, in March 1861, he was forced to marry one of the family's servants after getting her pregnant. Burley left for North America with another clerk to take part in the American Civil War. He joined the Confederates, disrupting Union ship traffic. Burley was captured in May 1864 but escaped a month later. He took part in a raid on Lake Erie in September 1864 led by John Yates Beall. Burley had convinced a Canadian cousin in Guelph, Adam Robertson, to manufacture munitions for use in that raid. He returned to Guelph but was later captured and extradited to the United States. The jury deadlocked at his first trial and he was returned to jail to await a second trial. Burley was able to escape to Canada and returned to Scotland. At this point, he changed his name to Bennet Burleigh.

Burley later sought to fight for Greece against the Turks in the Great Cretan Revolution of 1866–1869. He was involved in the efforts to create a foreign volunteer expedition and he successfully recruited Henry McIver.

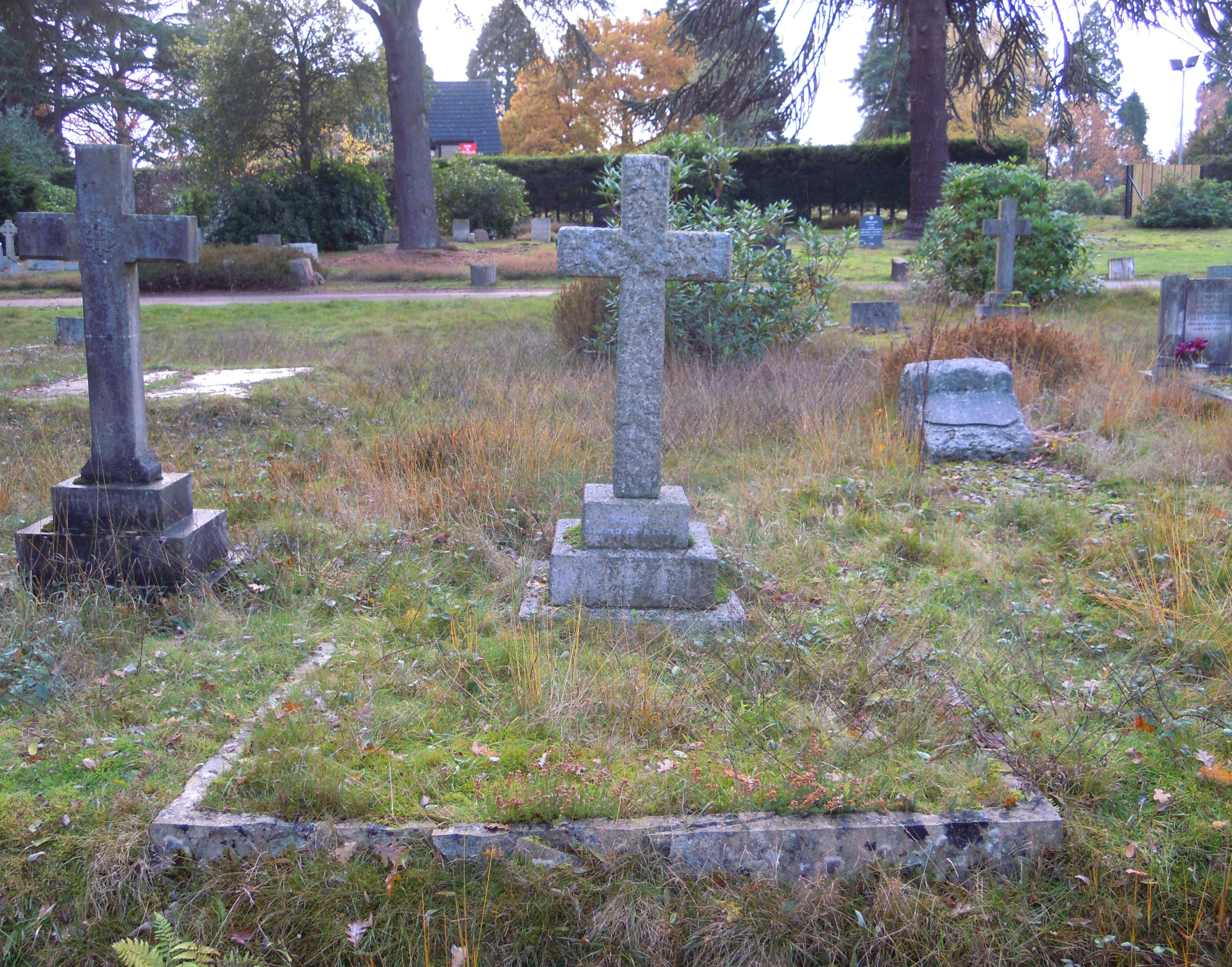
Burleigh's grave in Brookwood Cemetery

In 1881, Burleigh was hired by the London Telegraph to cover the war in Sudan. He was a correspondent for the Central News Agency during the bombardment of Alexandria in 1882. Burleigh was the first to report the failure of the Gordon relief expedition, which led to the slaughter of the Khartoum garrison.

Burleigh covered the Greco-Turkish War of 1897 initially from a fervently pro-Greek perspective, but becoming disillusioned as the war went on and Greece lost. In the Balkan Wars, his pro-Greek attitude was seemingly revived, as he reported favourably on Greece's military successes.

He also covered the Boer War and the Russo-Japanese War. He authored several books on his experiences reporting on conflict.

Burleigh ran unsuccessfully several times for Glasgow seats in the British parliament.

He died in Bexhill on June 17, 1914 and was buried in Brookwood Cemetery.

Burleigh is thought by some to be a model for the correspondent Gilbert Torpenhow in Rudyard Kipling's The Light That Failed.

== Bibliography ==
- Khartoum Campaign 1898: or the Reconquest of the Soudan, 1899
- The Natal Campaign, 1900
- Empire of the East; or, Japan and Russia at war, 1904-5, 1905
- Greaves, Graeden: Wild Bennet Burleigh: The Pen and the Pistol. 2012
