= Gavriil Marinakis =

Fighter in the Cretan Revolution of 1866

Hegumen Gavriil Marinakis
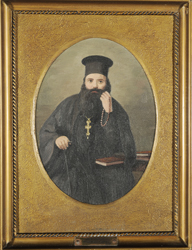
- Gavriil Marinakis (National Historical Museum of Greece).
- Native name: Γαβριήλ Μαρινάκης
- Born: c. 1826; Margarites, Rethymno, Crete, Ottoman Empire
- Died: 9 November 1866 Arkadi Monastery, Crete, Ottoman Empire (now Greece)
- Buried: Courtyard of Arkadi Monastery
- Allegiance: Kingdom of Greece
- Branch: Cretan Revolutionaries
- Conflicts: Cretan revolt (1866–1869): Siege of Arkadi Monastery †

Gavriil Marinakis (Greek: Γαβριήλ Μαρινάκης, c. 1826 - 1866) was the hegumenos of Arkadi Monastery and a fighter of the Cretan Revolution of 1866. He was killed in November 1866 during the siege of the monastery by the Ottoman forces.

== Biography ==
Gavriil Marinakis was born in Margarites, Rethymno round 1826. In 1856 he was elected hegumenos of Arkadi Monastery. From that position, he took important initiatives for the reconstruction of the monastery. He was quite active at the management of monastic property making sure the monastery land was properly registered. He also donated numerous olive trees to the monastery land.

When the Cretan Revolution of 1866 broke out, Gabriel decided to participate. On 1 October 1866 he participated in the General Assembly of the revolutionaries in Fres, a village near Chania, as chairman of the Revolutionary Committee of Rethymno. Through the General Assembly they tried to appeal to the consuls of the Great Powers in Crete, in order to ensure that a general massacre of women and children by the Ottoman troops would be avoided. At the end of the same month, he participated in a war council held at Arkadi Monastery. There, together with other monks and the chieftain Georgios Daskalakis he disagreed with the proposal of colonel Panos Koronaios to abandon Arkadi, because it was not strong enough for effective defense in a possible Turkish attack. At the same time, he rejected another proposal of Koronaios to destroy the stables and the mill that could provide a bridgehead for enemy forces. However, that was a significant mistake, as Koronaios’ fears proved to be well founded.

On 6 November 1866, a powerful force of Ottoman troops encircled the monastery. In the monastery there were about 950 people, of which only 300 were armed. Two days later the hostilities began. The hostilities led to the fall of the monastery on 9 November. Gabriel took part in the battle not only by carrying munitions, but also by encouraging the fighters and fighting along their side. Most historians speculate that Gabriel was killed on the last day of the siege. It seems that he either committed suicide to avoid being captured or that he was shot in the stomach. Ottoman soldiers cut off his head, after stripping his dead body of his clothes. Afterwards, they carried his severed head as a trophy and displayed it in different regions of Crete. The day after the monastery's capture, Gabriel’s decapitated body was buried in the courtyard of the monastery.
