= Cretan War =

Cretan War may refer to multiple wars involving the island of Crete, including:

- Cretan War (205–200 BC), a war between King Philip V of Macedon and Rhodes
- Cretan War (1645–1669), a war between the Republic of Venice and the Ottoman Empire

== See also ==
- Cretan Revolt (disambiguation), various uprisings on Crete
- Battle of Crete, a battle of World War II
