= Adam Robertson (Canadian politician) =

Canadian politician

Adam Robertson (ca 1812 – May 28, 1882) was a Scottish-born foundry owner and politician in Ontario, Canada. He served as mayor of Guelph in 1873.

Robertson arrived in Canada during the 1830s and stopped in Brantford and Paris before arriving in Guelph in 1847. He established two iron foundries there with various partners and then, in 1852, he established his own foundry, which mainly produced farm implements. During the American Civil War, a cousin of Robertson, Bennet Burley, who was sympathetic to the South, persuaded him to manufacture several cannons and cannonballs. The munitions were to be used to free Confederate prisoners imprisoned on Johnson's Island and capture a Union warship guarding the island. The Union army became aware of the plot and the conspirators were forced to flee. Robertson's cousin was later arrested but escaped; the ringleader, one John Yates Beall, was tried and executed. Burley later changed his surname to Burleigh and became a famed British war correspondent. Robertson remained a prominent Guelph citizen, serving several terms on Guelph council.

Robertson died in Guelph at the age of 70. His former home was designated a heritage property by the city.
