= Bali, Greece =

Village in Greece

Coordinates: 35.412°N 24.783°E

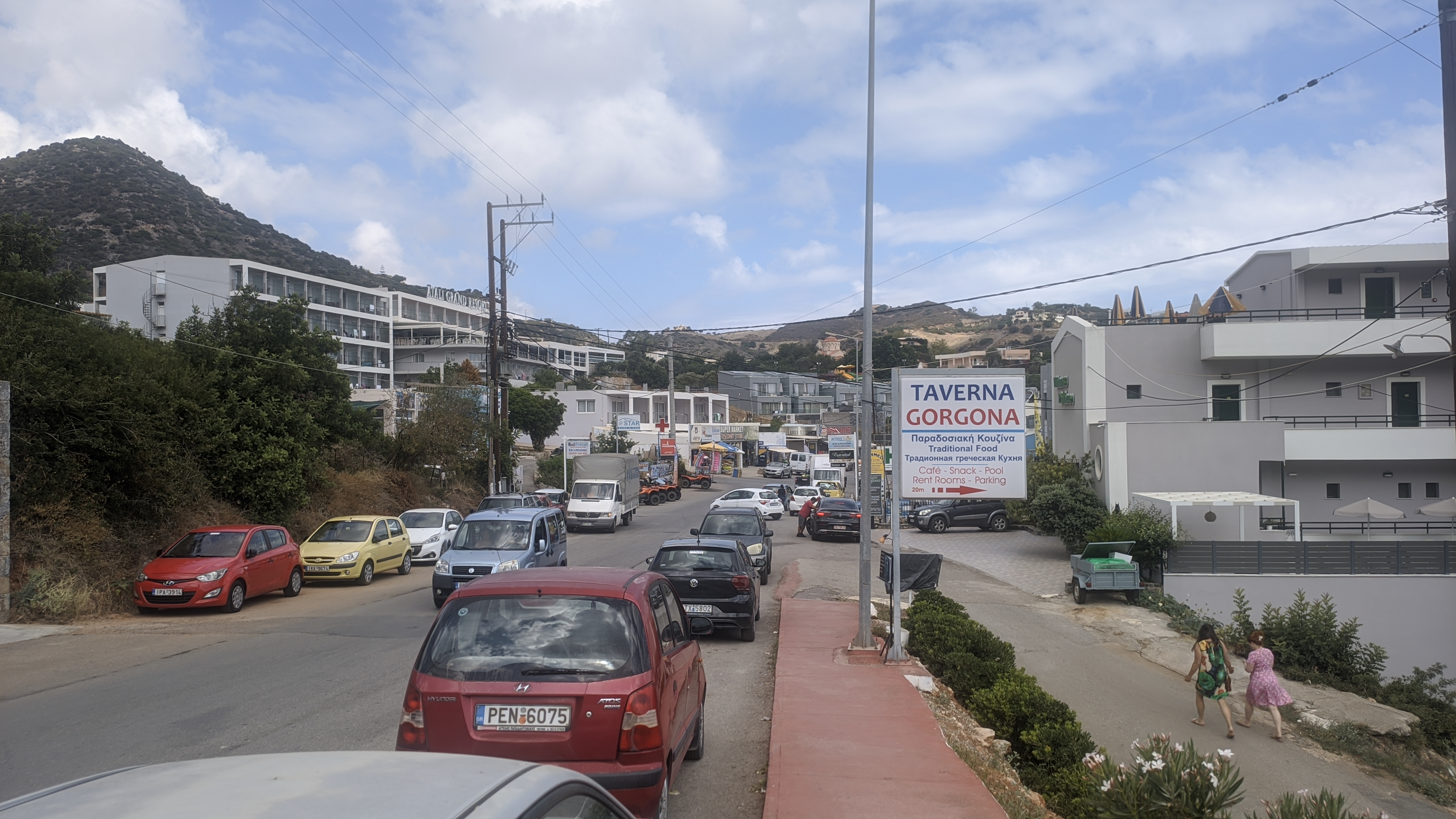
Centre of Bali

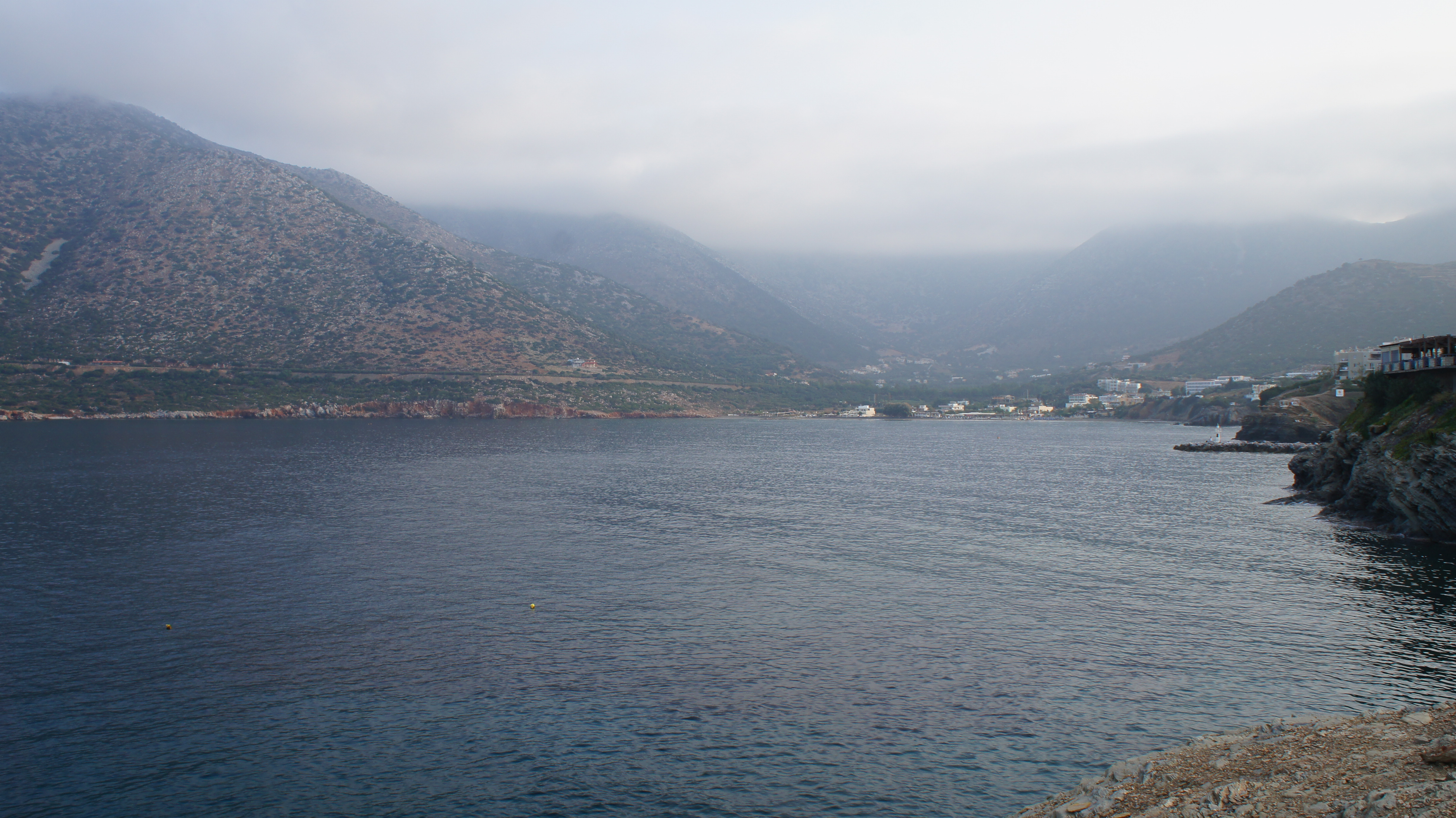

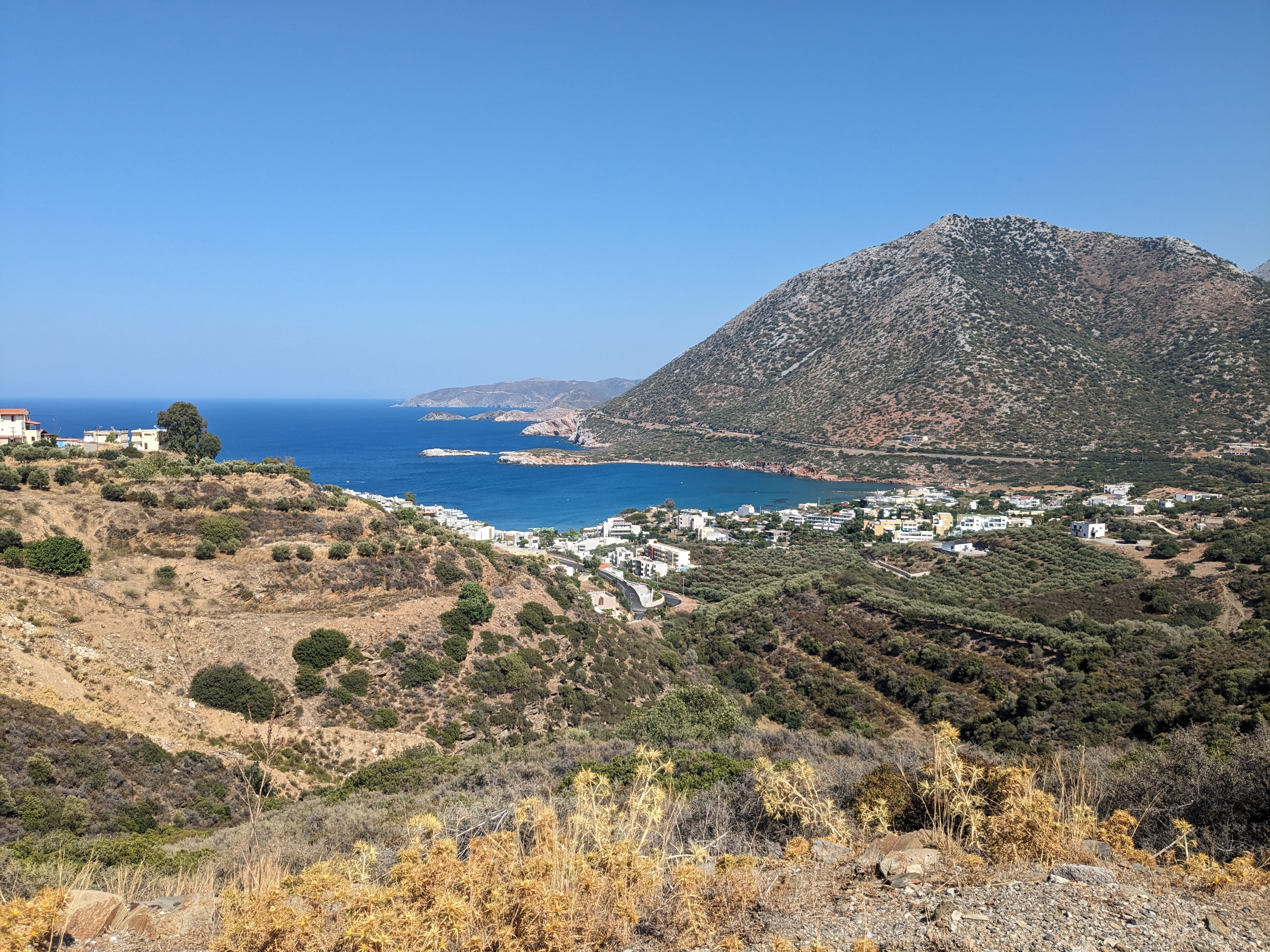
A view of Bali in Crete from the road above

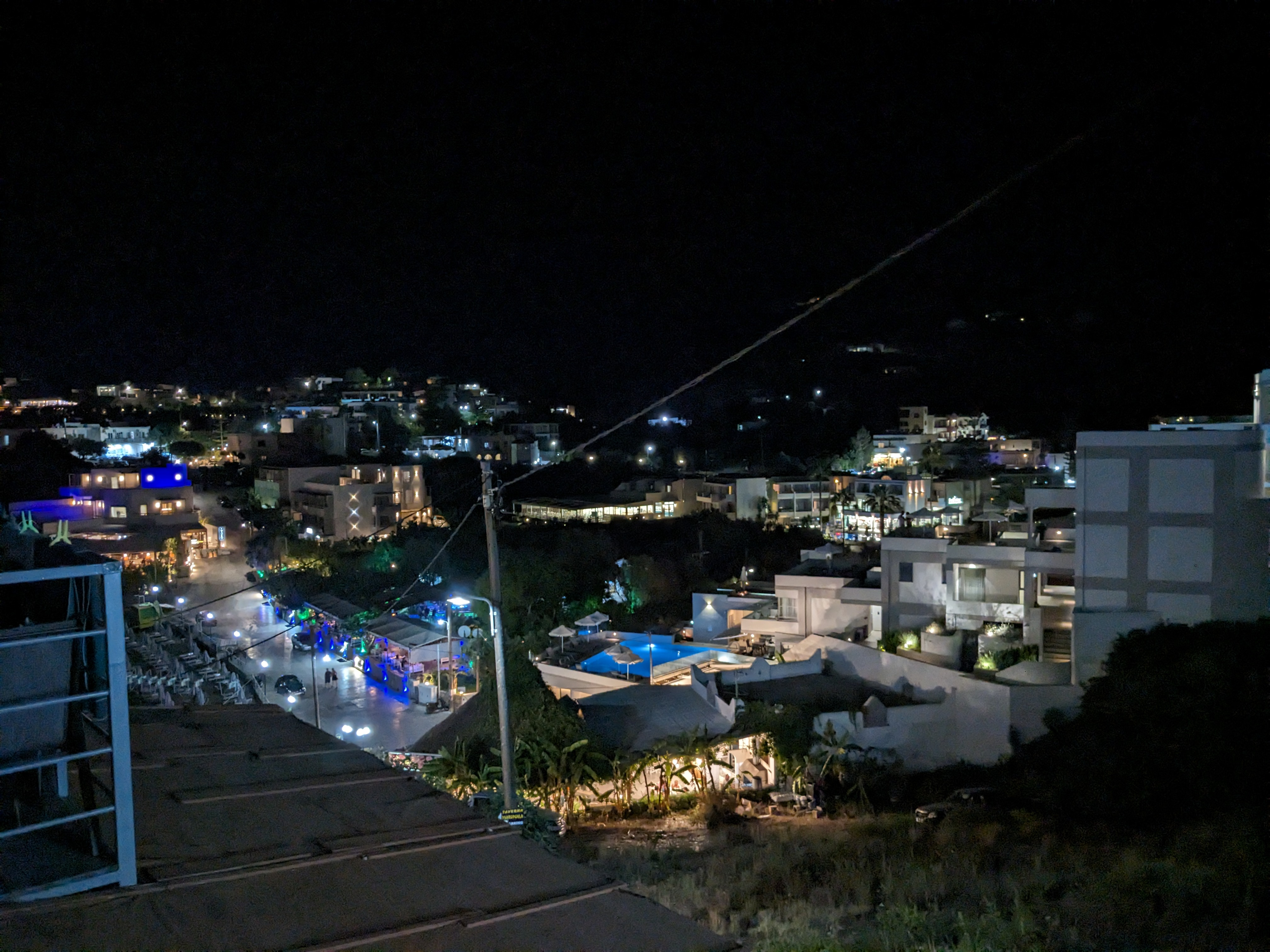
Bali at night

Bali (Greek: Μπαλί) is a seaside village in the Mylopotamos municipality, Rethymno regional unit, Crete, Greece. It is part of the community Melidoni. Located on the site of ancient Astale, and the harbor of Axus, in more recent times the sleepy fishing village of Bali has developed into a thriving tourist destination, with a significant rise in the number of accommodations, including hotels, apartments, and boutique resorts. The town is particularly known for its numerous spas, wellness centres, and luxury hotels that cater to tourists. As a result, tourism has become the primary driver of the local economy, with businesses ranging from restaurants and souvenir shops to water sports centres and tour companies ready to serve the influx of visitors. Bali's picturesque coves and beaches are a key attraction, and its proximity to Rethymno makes it a popular base for exploring the surrounding region. Unlike the island of Bali in Indonesia, Bali in Crete is pronounced with the emphasis on the last syllable.

== Climate ==
Bali has a Mediterranean climate. The average high temperature during the summer period varies between 27-29°C.

Climate data for Bali
Month	Jan	Feb	Mar	Apr	May	Jun	Jul	Aug	Sep	Oct	Nov	Dec	Year
Mean daily maximum °C (°F)	14.0 (57.2)	14.0 (57.2)	16.0 (60.8)	19.0 (66.2)	23.0 (73.4)	27.0 (80.6)	29.0 (84.2)	28.0 (82.4)	26.0 (78.8)	22.0 (71.6)	19.0 (66.2)	16.0 (60.8)	21.1 (70.0)
Mean daily minimum °C (°F)	8.0 (46.4)	8.0 (46.4)	9.0 (48.2)	11.0 (51.8)	14.0 (57.2)	18.0 (64.4)	21.0 (69.8)	21.0 (69.8)	18.0 (64.4)	15.0 (59.0)	12.0 (53.6)	10.0 (50.0)	13.8 (56.8)
Average rainfall mm (inches)	143.0 (5.63)	112.0 (4.41)	84.0 (3.31)	35.0 (1.38)	18.0 (0.71)	6.0 (0.24)	2.0 (0.08)	1.0 (0.04)	21.0 (0.83)	90.0 (3.54)	78.0 (3.07)	111.0 (4.37)	701 (27.61)
Average rainy days	12.0	11.0	8.0	5.0	3.0	1.0	0.0	0.0	1.0	5.0	8.0	13.0	67
Mean daily sunshine hours	4.0	5.0	6.0	8.0	10.0	12.0	12.0	11.0	10.0	6.0	5.0	4.0	7.8
Percentage possible sunshine	40	45	50	62	71	80	86	85	83	55	50	40	62
Source: Weather Atlas

Climate data for Bali
Month	Jan	Feb	Mar	Apr	May	Jun	Jul	Aug	Sep	Oct	Nov	Dec	Year
Average sea temperature °C (°F)	16.0 (61.0)	15.0 (59.0)	15.0 (59.0)	16.0 (61.0)	19.0 (66.0)	22.0 (72.0)	24.0 (75.0)	25.0 (77.0)	24.0 (75.0)	22.0 (72.0)	20.0 (68.0)	17.0 (63.0)	19.6 (67.3)
Mean daily daylight hours	10.0	11.0	12.0	13.0	14.0	15.0	14.0	13.0	12.0	11.0	10.0	10.0	12.1
Average Ultraviolet index	3	4	5	7	9	10	11	10	8	5	3	2	6.4
Source: Weather Atlas
