= Zaros =

Zaros Ζαρός
- Municipal unit
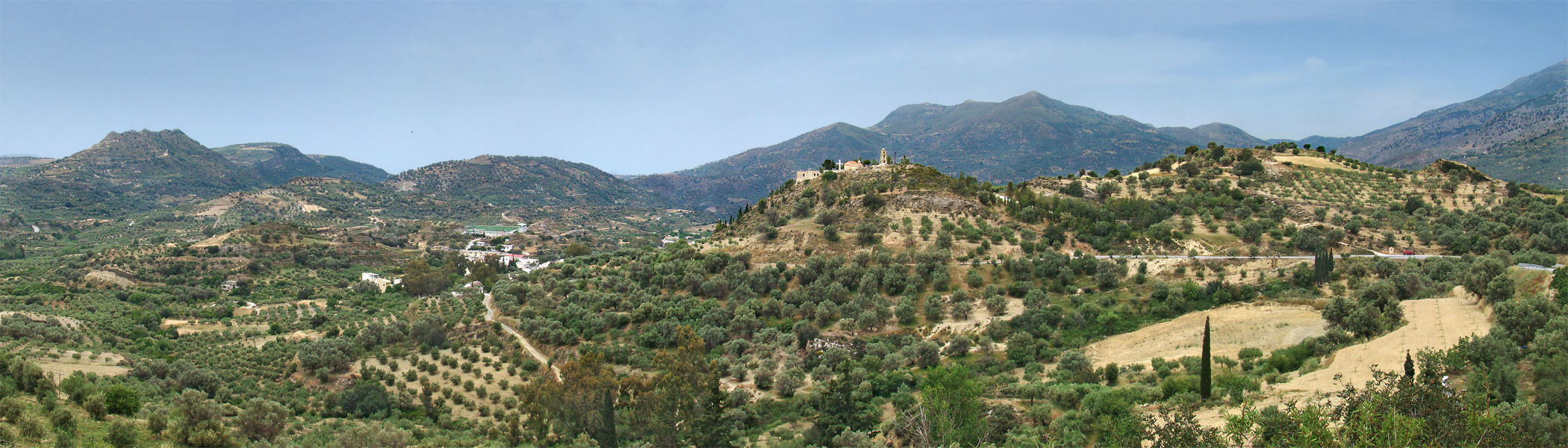
- Landscape around Zaros

- Location within the regional unit

- Location within Greece
- Coordinates: 35°7′N 24°54′E
- Country: Greece
- Administrative region: Crete
- Regional unit: Heraklion
- Municipality: Faistos

Area
  - Municipal unit: 71.8 km^{2} (27.7 sq mi)
- Elevation: 340 m (1,120 ft)

Population (2021)
  - Municipal unit: 2,565
  - Municipal unit density: 35.7/km^{2} (92.5/sq mi)
  - Community: 1,756
- Time zone: UTC+2 (EET)
  - Summer (DST): UTC+3 (EEST)
- Postal code: 70002
- Area code: 28940
- Website: www.zaros.gr

Zaros (Greek: Ζαρός) is a village and a former municipality in the Heraklion regional unit, Crete, Greece. Since the 2011 local government reform it is part of the municipality Faistos, of which it is a municipal unit. The municipal unit has an area of 71.803 km^{2} (27.723 sq mi). Population 2,565 (2021). Zaros village, at an altitude of 340 metres, is a village with a lake and gorge nearby. The village has a couple of hotels and it is 44 km from Heraklion at the southern foothills of Mount Psiloritis. The population produce olive oil, sultanas, vegetables and spring water. There are a couple of tavernas that serve trout. Close by is Rouvas Gorge, which is part of the Psiloritis mountain range and is on the hiking route known as the E4 European Walking Path. Nearby Zaros village are traditional water mills which have been working since the 16th century, as well as archaeological sites and monasteries. Zaros is also famous for its bottled water derived from Lake Votomos.

== Zaros in literature ==
In James Aldridge's 1944 novel of the escape of a Greek partisan and two Australian soldiers after the Battle of Crete The Sea Eagle, the three are befriended and shaved by a barber in Zaros ("Saros" in the text).

== See also ==
- Vrontisi Monastery
