= Varsamonerou Monastery =

Greek Orthodox former monastery in Crete, Greece

- Μονή Βαρσαμόνερου
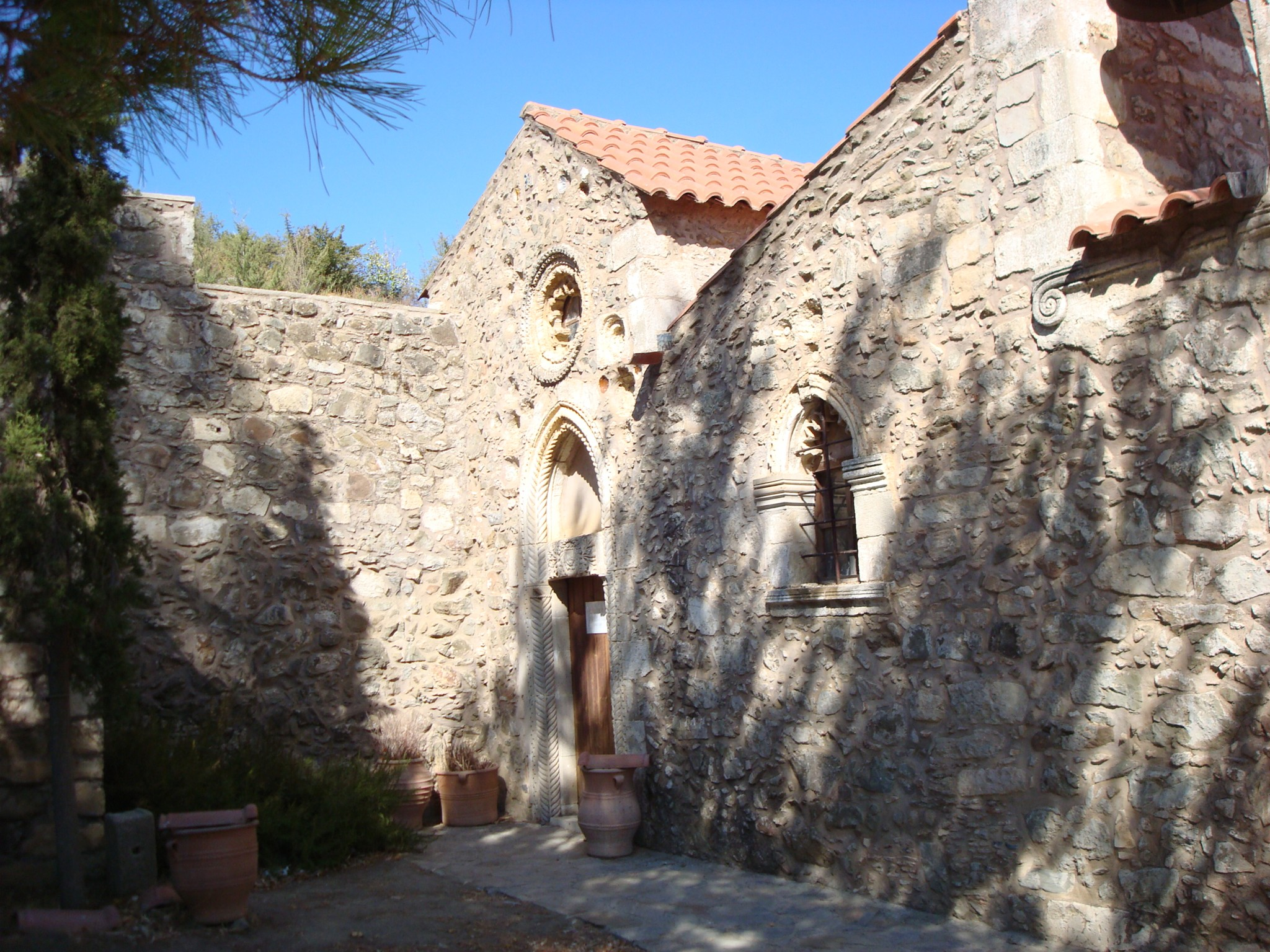
- View of the extant church

- Location of the former monastery in Crete
- Interactive map of Varsamonerou Monastery

Monastery information
- Order: Ecumenical Patriarchate of Constantinople
- Denomination: Greek Orthodox
- Dedication: Virgin Mary Hodegetria; John the Baptist
- Archdiocese: Church of Crete

Architecture
- Status: Monastery (c. 13th – c. 18th century); Katholikon
- Functional status: Abandoned (as a monastery); Active (as a church)
- Style: Byzantine
- Completion date: Early Venetian period (c. 13th century)

Site
- Location: Voriza, Mt. Ida, Heraklion, Crete
- Country: Greece
- Coordinates: 35°8′25″N 24°51′49″E

The Varsamonerou Monastery (Greek: Μονή Βαρσαμόνερου), also spelled as the Valsamonerou Monastery (Μονή Βαλσαμόνερου) is a Greek Orthodox former monastery, now church, situated near the village of Voriza, in the Heraklion region of south-central Crete, Greece. It is built on the south slopes of Mt. Ida, approximately 55 kilometres (34 mi) southwest of the city of Heraklion. The site has a panoramic view of the Mesara Plain.

== History ==
The monastery dates from the early Venetian period but the exact date of its establishment is unknown. Venetian archives dating as early as 1332 refer to it as Chiesa della Madonna di Varsamonero. The monastery acted a regional monastic and cultural centre until the 15th century. The nearby Vrontisi Monastery was established as its metochion around 1400. According to an inventory taken in 1644, the monastery had in its possession various philosophical texts and manuscripts by Xenophon, Aeschines and Plutarch. The Varsamonerou Monastery started to decline after 1500 and was eventually abandoned in the 18th century, and is uninhabited. Restoration works overseen by the Ephorate of Byzantine Antiquities are ongoing.

== Architecture ==
The main building is a two-nave church (katholikon). The northern nave is dedicated to the Virgin Mary Hodegetria and the southern one to John the Baptist. A third, transverse nave is dedicated to Saint Phanourios. The church is covered with high-quality frescoes that date from the late-14th until the early-15th centuries. These frescoes are among the most important samples executed in Crete during the Venetian era and survive in excellent condition. The church was restored in 1947.

The exceptional wood-carved iconostasis of the church is displayed at the Historical Museum in Heraklion.

== See also ==
- Church of Crete
- List of Greek Orthodox monasteries in Greece
