= John Yates Beall =

Confederate spy during the American Civil War

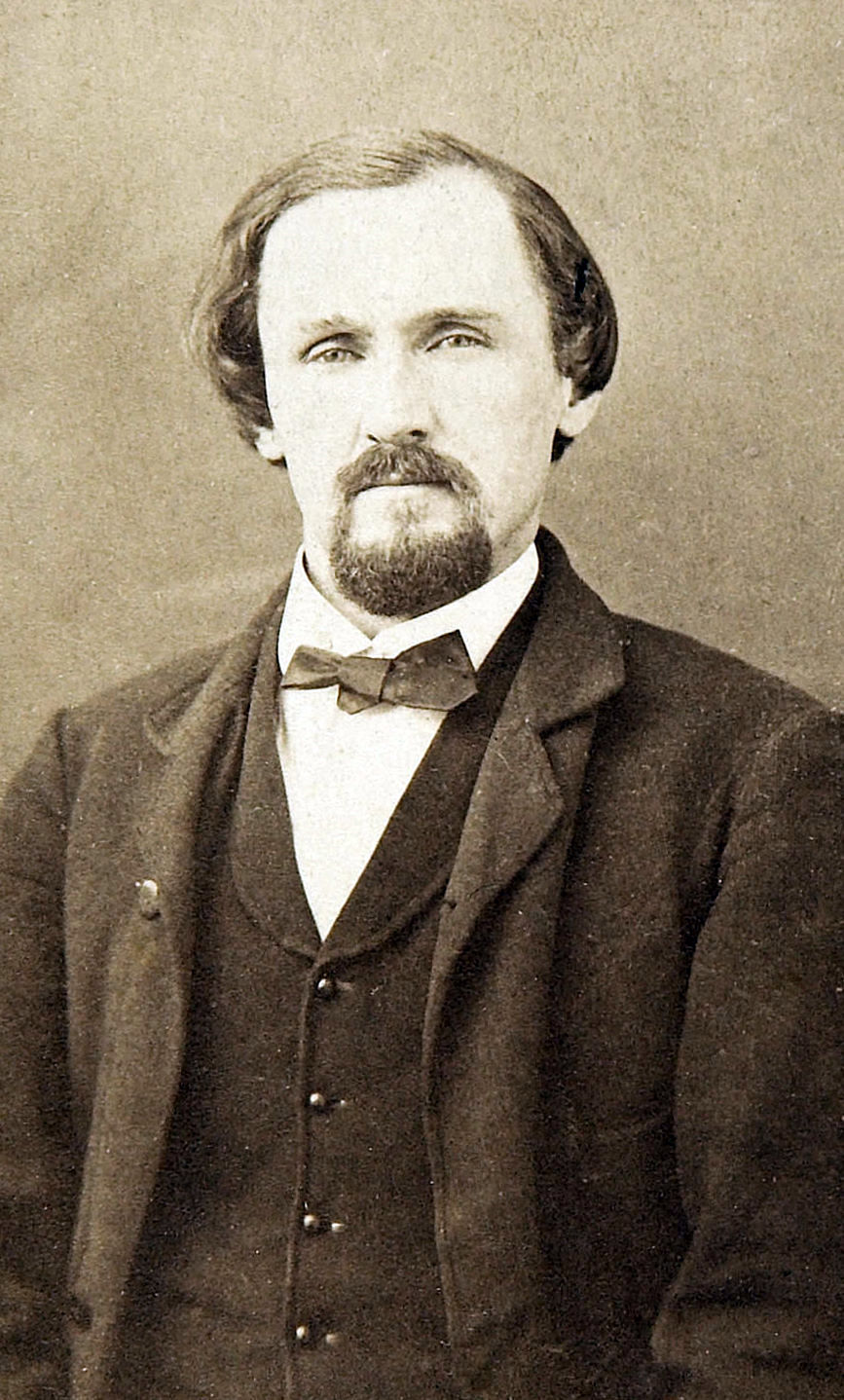
- John Yates Beall on the day of his execution
- Born: January 1, 1835; Jefferson County, Virginia, U.S. (now West Virginia)
- Died: February 24, 1865 (aged 30); Fort Columbus, Governors Island, New York, U.S.
- Cause of death: Execution by hanging
- Military career
- Allegiance: Confederate States of America
- Branch: Confederate States Army; Confederate States Navy
- Service years: 1861–1865
- Rank: Acting Master
- Unit: 2nd Virginia Infantry
- Commands: The Raven; The Swan
- Conflicts: American Civil War

John Yates Beall (January 1, 1835 – February 24, 1865) was a Confederate privateer in the American Civil War who was arrested as a spy in New York and executed at Fort Columbus on Governors Island.

== Early life and education ==
Beall was born in Jefferson County, Virginia (now West Virginia) on his father's farm, Walnut Grove. He attended the University of Virginia to study law but upon the death of his father in 1855 he left his studies to take up farming.

The New York Times reported that Beall owned a plantation with 100 slaves.

BEALL is a native of Jefferson County, Virginia, 32 years of age, and was educated at the Charlottesville University. When the war broke out he was owner of a large plantation and one hundred slaves, possessing beside a large fortune, and is said to be heir apparent to Lord EGELBY, a British nobleman. He entered the rebel service as Captain of Company G, Second Virginia Regiment, Col. ALLEN, which was attached to Stonewall JACKSON's brigade. He afterward was transferred to the rebel navy, and while holding a commission as Acting Master from the authorities at Richmond, committed the crimes which he is condemned to expiate with his life.

== Civil War ==
At the start of the war, Beall joined Bott's Grays, Company G, in the 2nd Virginia Infantry. He received a wound in the lungs which left him incapable of active service.

Inspired by John Hunt Morgan, he conceived a plan to launch privateers on the Great Lakes. He presented his plan to Confederate authorities, who were interested but declined to act since it might endanger relations with neutral Britain. Beall was commissioned as acting master in the Confederate States Navy, though not given a command. He then proceeded on his own as a privateer, active in the areas of the Potomac River and Chesapeake Bay. He assembled a crew of 18 men and commanded two boats, The Raven and The Swan. His second in command was a 22-year-old Scotsman named Bennet G. Burley. Beall was captured by Union forces in November 1863 and jailed at Fort McHenry, in Baltimore, until he was released in a prisoner exchange on May 5, 1864.

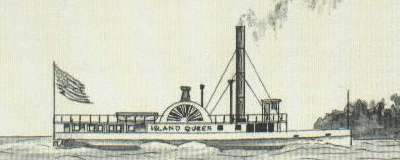
The Island Queen

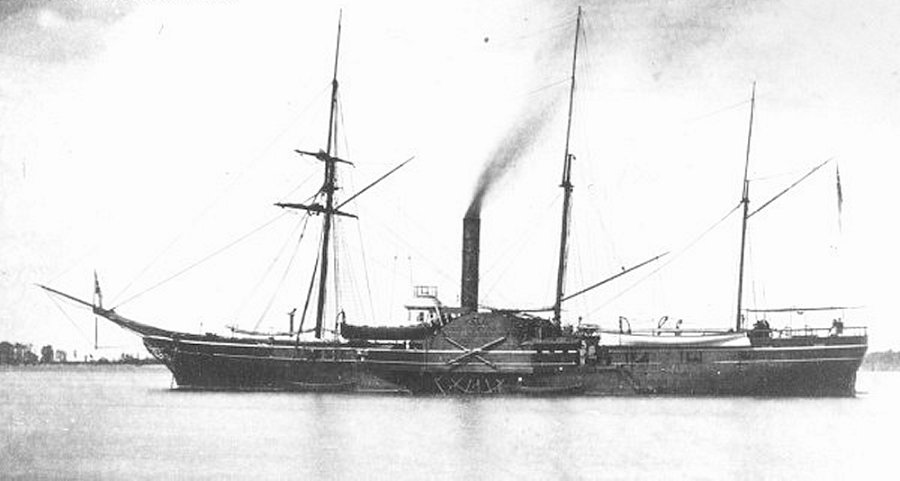
An early image of USS Michigan, circa 1860.

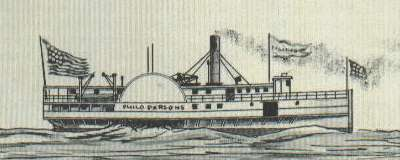
The Philo Parsons

Upon his release, he returned to the north shore of Lake Erie to Canada West, part of the Province of Canada, in order to implement a plan to free Confederate prisoners on Johnson's Island. On September 18, 1864, a small group of volunteers embarked from Sandwich and Amherstburg, Canada West, and, with Beall, captured the ship Philo Parsons off Kelleys Island, and then the Island Queen, which was scuttled. The plan included capturing the U.S. gunboat Michigan. However, at this point the crew refused to proceed further without outside assistance. Beall reluctantly agreed, and together they sailed back to Sandwich (the former name of and now a neighborhood of Windsor, Ontario), where they scuttled the Philo Parsons and separated, all escaping arrest except for Burley, whose extradition was demanded by U.S. authorities.

Beall then decided to free some captured Confederate officers by derailing a passenger train, but he and a companion, George S. Anderson, were arrested in Niagara, New York, on December 16, 1864. They were imprisoned at Fort Lafayette, New York. Anderson agreed to testify against Beall in return for leniency.

General John Adams Dix ordered a military commission for Beall's trial, which began on January 17, 1865. He was represented by James T. Brady. The arrest of Beall had not been published in any newspaper, and Confederate authorities were unaware of his status. On February 8, the commission found him guilty on all charges and sentenced him to death. Beall was then transported to and held at Fort Columbus on Governors Island in New York Harbor to await his execution.

The story of Beall's arrest and trial then appeared in the newspapers, and efforts were made to save him. Appeals were made to President Abraham Lincoln by many prominent people, including six U.S. Senators and 91 members of Congress, but Lincoln refused to intervene, not wanting to undermine Dix's authority. Another reason he cited was that Beall's actions had endangered the lives of Northern civilians. Beall was executed on February 24, 1865. His last words were "I protest against this execution. It is absolute murder—brutal murder. I die in the service and defence of my country."
