= Michail Korakas =

Cretan revolutionary (1797–1882)

Captain Michail Korakas Μιχαήλ Κόρακας
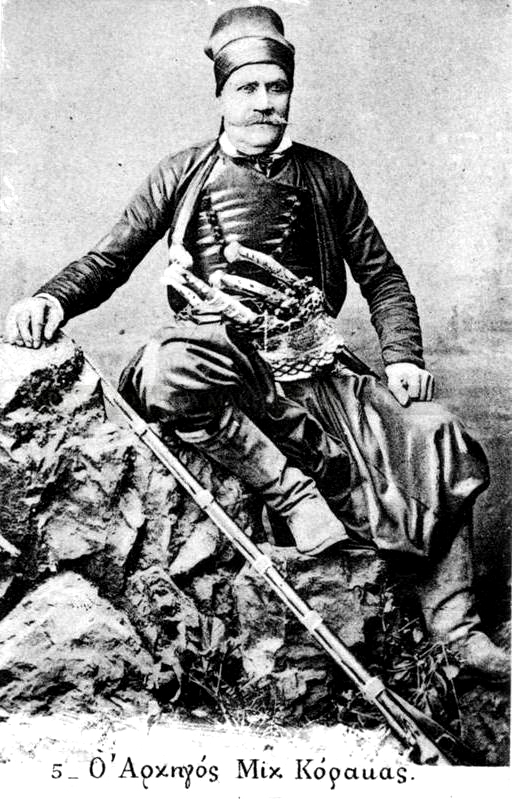
- Photograph of Michail Korakas wearing traditional Cretan costume and carrying a full array of weapons.
- Born: 1797; Pombia, Crete, Ottoman Empire
- Died: 1882 (aged 85) Pombia, Crete, Ottoman Empire
- Buried: Crete
- Allegiance: (Greece) First Hellenic Republic; Kingdom of Greece
- Branch: Greek Revolutionary Army; Hellenic Army; Cretan Revolutionaries
- Rank: Captain
- Conflicts: Greek War of Independence: Battle of Malaxa; Cretan revolt (1866–1869); Cretan revolt (1878)
- Children: Aristotelis Korakas (son)

Michail Korakas (Greek: Μιχαήλ Κόρακας, 1797–1882) was a Cretan revolutionary, who played a major role in successive Cretan revolts against the Ottoman Empire in 1821–29, 1841, 1858, 1866–69, and 1878.

== Life ==
He was born in the village of Pombia in central Crete in 1797. From a young age, he became a brigand, attacking the local Turks.

Upon the outbreak of the Greek War of Independence in 1821, he joined the Cretan uprising. In 1827 he was wounded at the battle of Malaxa. Shortly after he left Crete for Karpathos, where he put together a small fleet of three vessels and 70 fighters, with which he raided the ships sent to supply the Turkish garrisons on Crete. In 1828 he crossed over into the Peloponnese with 110 fellow Cretans and fought in the last battles of the War of Independence under Dimitrios Kallergis. For his services he was decorated with the bronze Cross of the War of Independence, received the rank of captain, and 100 stremmata near Argos.

Nevertheless, in 1834 he left the independent Greek state to return to Crete. There he participated in the uprisings of 1841 and 1858. After the latter, he was appointed yusbashi (Captain) of the local Cretan gendarmerie, but resigned in 1863. When the Great Cretan Revolution broke out in 1866, he put together the first sizeable rebel column, of 2,000 foot and 1,100 horse. After his house was burned down by Ottoman troops, he proceeded to torch 70 Turkish settlements within two days. The rebels' national convention appointed him commander-in-chief of the 12 eastern provinces of Crete, a post he held until the uprising's suppression in 1869. In 1878 he once more led the eastern provinces in revolt that led to the granting of autonomy in the Pact of Halepa. After that he once more left Crete for Athens and then for Egypt, returning to Crete in 1882, and dying there in 1882.

His son Aristotelis Korakas became an officer in the Hellenic Army and rose to the rank of Lieutenant General.

== Sources ==
- Moschovitis, P. (1929). "Κόρακας". Μεγάλη Στρατιωτική και Ναυτική Εγκυκλοπαιδεία. Τόμος Δ′: Καβάδης – Μωριάς [Great Military and Naval Encyclopedia. Volume IV: Kavadis - Morias] (in Greek). Athens: Έκδοσις Μεγάλης Στρατιωτικής και Ναυτικής Εγκυκλοπαιδείας. pp. 193–194.
