= Astale =

Roman town of ancient Crete

Coordinates: 35°24′53″N 24°46′59″E

Astale (Ancient Greek: Άστάλη) was a Roman town of ancient Crete. According to the Stadiasmus Maris Magni, it was located on the north coast of Crete, 30 stadia from an unknown location Amphimatrion (Άμφιματρίον), probably meaning Amphimalion, and 300 stadia from Herakleion. It was the harbour of Axus; excavations have taken place at the site.

The site of Astale is located near modern Bali.
