= Axos =

Ancient city of Crete

Coordinates: 35°18′26″N 24°50′39″E

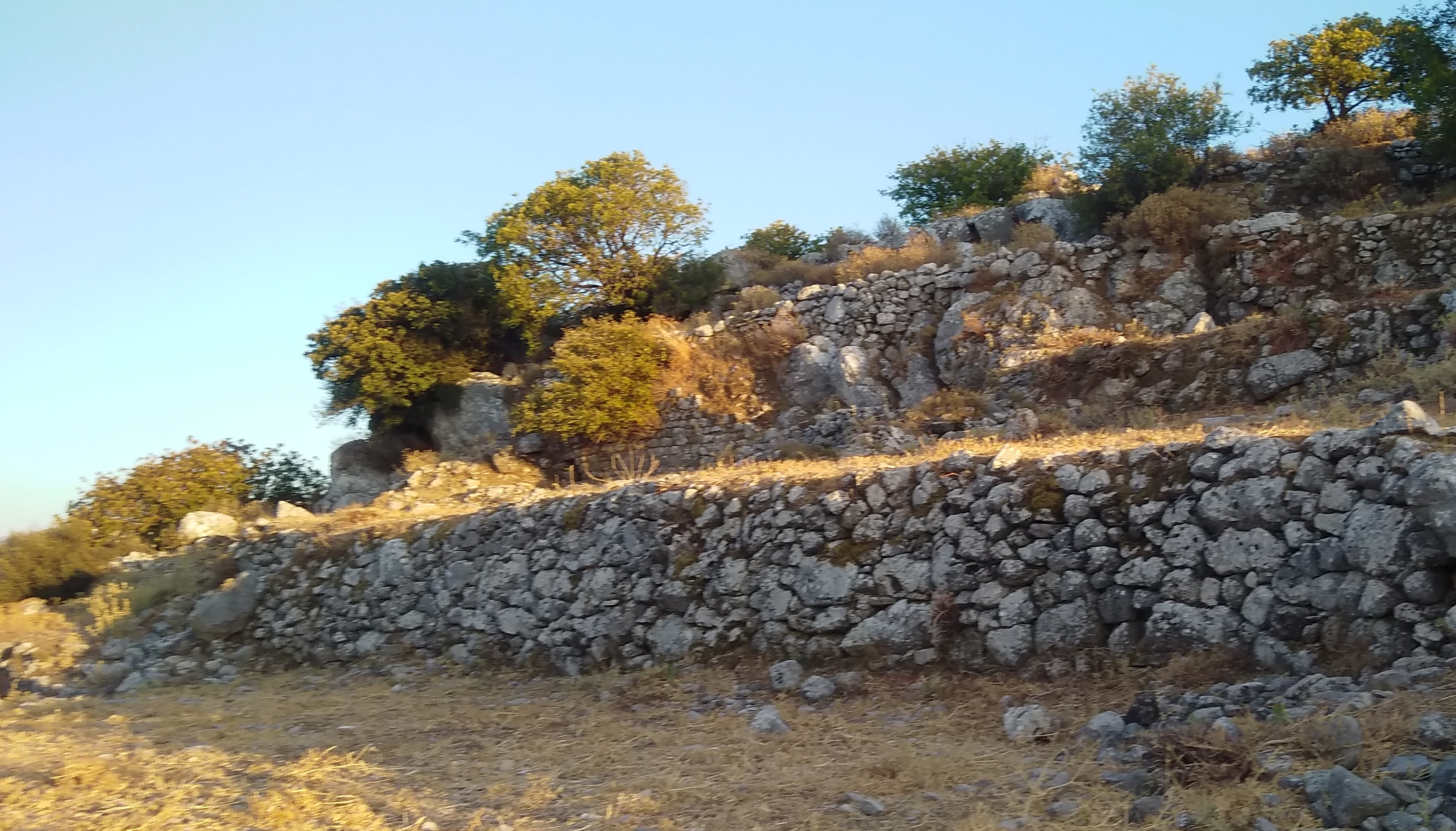
Ancient Axos

Axos (Note: /ˈæksoʊs/; also spelled as Axus /ˈæksʌs/; Ancient Greek: Ἄξος or Ὄαξος or Ϝάξος, romanised as áxos or óaxos or wáxos) was an ancient city in Crete. It was an inland town located on the slopes of Mount Ida and its harbour was at Astale. During the classical period, it was a polis (city-state).

== Name ==
The Linear B toponym "e-ko-so" has been hypothesized to refer to an early settlement at the site. However, because of the differing vowel quality and the lack of an initial digamma, it is not certain that the two terms are in fact linked.

== History ==
Remains from the Late Minoan IIIC period have been found at the site, southeast of the modern village of Axos, at an elevation of 600 meters. However, few remains from this early period have been preserved. Some pottery fragments indicate that there was a presence at the site during the Dark Ages. It was subsequently inhabited from the Geometric period until the Byzantine period.

Throughout history, the city has been mentioned by classical authors: Herodotus, Virgil, Cicero, Strabo, Stephen of Byzantium and Cristoforo Buondelmonti. In the Argonautica by Apollonius of Rhodes, Axos is identified as the place where the nymph Anchiale gave birth to the Dactyls of Ida, in a cave on Mount Dikte. It is also mentioned in a list of Cretan cities cited in a decree from Knossos dated around 259/233 BCE. and in a list of Cretan cities that signed an alliance with Eumenes II of Pergamum in 183 BCE. During the Roman and Byzantine periods, the city prospered, becoming an important episcopal see with many churches. It is also mentioned in the list of 22 Cretan cities by the Byzantine geographer of the 1 Hierocles.

The site of Axos is located near modern Axo,. The first excavations were conducted in 1899 by the Italian Archaeological School. Findings from the excavations included pottery, stone vessels, inscriptions, and many figurines of naked women. In the 19th century, remains belonging to so-called Cyclopean walls were found, and in the church a piece of white marble with a sepulchral inscription in the ancient Doric Greek language of the island. On another inscription was a decree of a "common assembly of the Cretans," an instance of the well known Syncretism, as it was called. The coins of Axos present types of Zeus and Apollo.
