= Aristotelis Korakas =

Aristotelis Korakas (Greek: Αριστοτέλης Κόρακας) was a Hellenic Army officer who rose to the rank of lieutenant general.

Born in the village of Pombia in Crete in 1858, Korakas was the son of the Cretan revolutionary leader Michail Korakas, who had played a leading role in successive Cretan uprisings against the Ottoman Empire from 1821 to 1878.

Korakas left his home island and enrolled in the Hellenic Army Academy, graduating as an adjutant of Engineers in 1880. In 1897, with the rank of captain, he led a volunteer corps to Crete to support the local uprising against the Ottomans. Following the Greek defeat in the Greco-Turkish War of 1897, however, he was obliged to withdraw from the island. He fought in the First Balkan War (1912–13) with the rank of Colonel, leading a Cretan volunteer corps in the Epirus front.

During World War I Korakas joined the Provisional Government of National Defence, and was appointed commander of V Army Corps in 1917 and of III Army Corps in 1918. After the end of World War I, he was posted as head of the military household of King Alexander of Greece. He retired from active service in July 1923 with the rank of Lt. General.

== Sources ==
- Moschovitis, P. (1929). Μεγάλη Στρατιωτικὴ καὶ Ναυτικὴ Ἐγκυκλοπαιδεία. Tόμος Τέταρτος: Καβάδης–Μωριάς [Great Military and Naval Encyclopaedia. Volume IV: Kavadh–Morea] (in Greek). Athens: Ἔκδοσις Μεγάλης Στρατιωτικῆς καὶ Ναυτικῆς Ἐγκυκλοπαιδείας. pp. 193–194. OCLC 31255024.
