= Cretan Revolt =

Cretan Revolt may refer to one of the following uprisings in Crete:

== Under Venetian rule ==
- Cretan Revolt (1212) of the Hagiostephanites family
- Cretan Revolt (1217) of the Skordiles and Melissenos families
- Cretan Revolt (1222) of the Melissenos family
- Cretan Revolt (1230)
- Revolt of the Chortatzes brothers (1272/73)
- Revolt of Alexios Kallergis (1282–1299)
- Revolt of Sfakia (1319)
- Cretan Revolt (1332)
- Cretan Revolt (1347)
- Revolt of Saint Titus (1363–1368)
- Conspiracy of Sifis Vlastos (1453–1454)
- Revolt of George Kantanoleos (1570)

== Under Ottoman rule ==
- Daskalogiannis Revolt (1770)
- Crete during the Greek War of Independence (1821–1828)
- Cretan Revolt (1841)
- Cretan Revolt (1858)
- Cretan Revolt (1866–1869)
- Cretan Revolt (1878)
- Cretan Revolt (1897–1898), which led to the creation of the Cretan State

== Under the Cretan State ==
- Theriso Revolt (1905)
