= Cretan revolt (1866–1869) =

Rebellion against Ottoman rule (1866–1869)

Great Cretan Revolution
- Part of the Cretan revolts
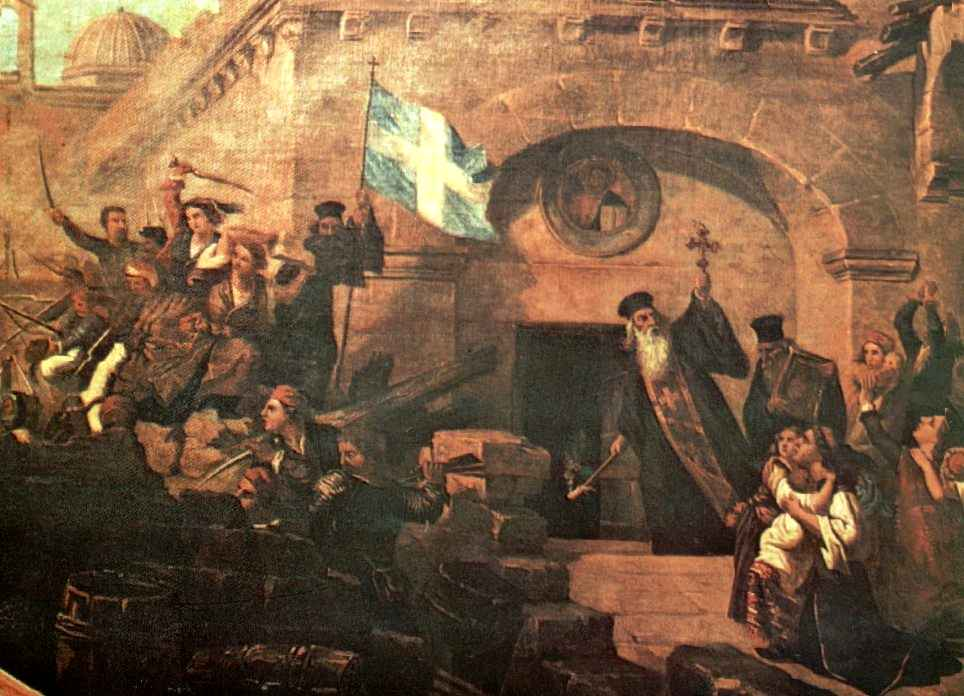
- The hegumen Gavriil gathering the besieged at Arkadi Monastery
Date	21 August 1866 – 20 January 1869
Location	Eyalet of Crete, Ottoman Empire (now Crete, Greece)
Result	Ottoman-led victory: Suppression of the revolt

Belligerents
Greek Revolutionaries: (Kingdom of Italy) Garibaldini; Supported by: Kingdom of Greece	Ottoman Empire; Egypt

Commanders and leaders
Michail Korakas; Gavriil Marinakis †; Ioannis Zymvrakakis; Konstantinos Giaboudakis †; Panos Koronaios; Ioannis Dimakopoulos † (Kingdom of Italy) Giuseppe Garibaldi (Note: Giuseppe Garibaldi did not directly fight in Crete due to lingering injuries to his legs, but he politically supported the Cretans and helped organize the Garibaldini. In a letter to French Garibaldian Jules Ballot (Jules Anemos), who was already in Crete, he wrote that, had his legs permitted it, he would have gone himself to Crete to share the fate of the Cretans. His son, Ricciotti Garibaldi, went to fight in his stead.) (Kingdom of Italy) Ricciotti Garibaldi	Mustafa Naili Pasha; Osman Nuri Pasha; Omar Pasha; Ismail Selim Pasha; Shaheen Pasha; Ahmed Rashid Pasha

Strength
25,000 Cretan revolutionaries 5,000 mainland Greek volunteers 200 Garibaldini	15,000 Ottomans; 20,000 Egyptians

Casualties and losses
Unknown	Unknown; 1,333 killed and wounded

The Cretan revolt of 1866–1869 (Greek: Κρητική Επανάσταση του 1866) or Great Cretan Revolution (Μεγάλη Κρητική Επανάσταση) was a three-year uprising in Crete against Ottoman rule, the third and largest in a series of Cretan revolts between the end of the Greek War of Independence in 1830 and the establishment of the independent Cretan State in 1898.

== Background ==
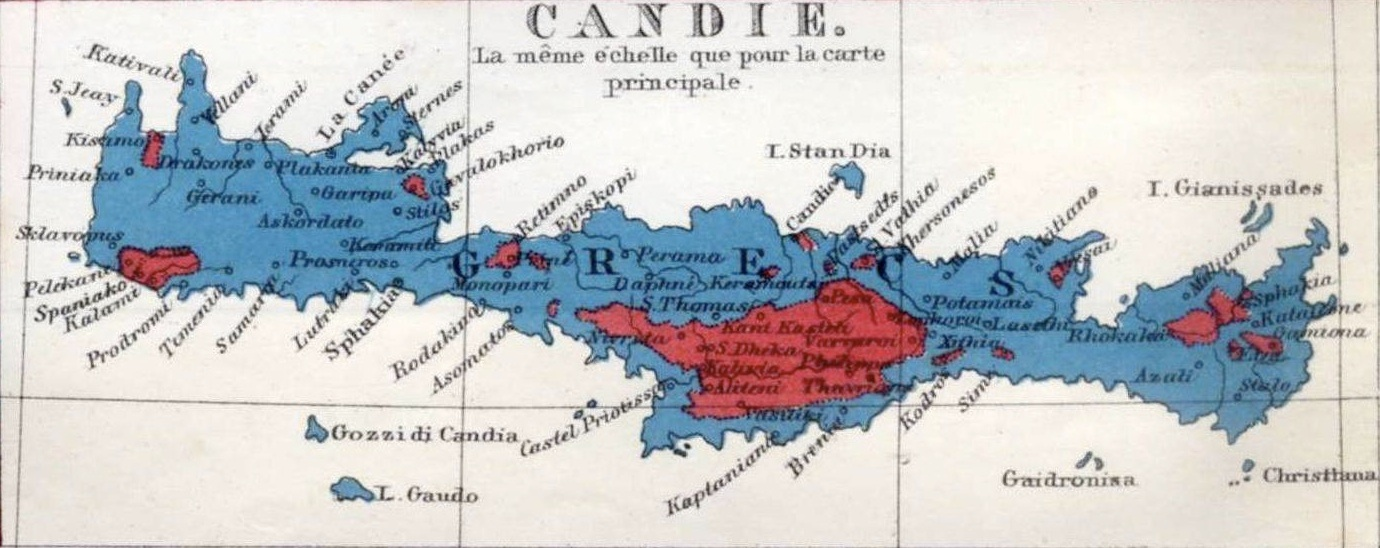
Map of the distribution in Crete in 1861 Greek Orthodox Cretan Muslim/Turkish

The Christian Cretans had risen up together with the rest of Greece in the Greek Revolution of 1821, but despite successes in the countryside, the Ottomans held out in the four fortified towns of the northern coast (Chania, Rethymno, Irakleio and Agios Nikolaos) and the island was eventually reconquered by 1828, becoming an Egyptian province (Muhammad Ali's Egypt, though nominally a vassal of the Ottoman Empire, was a regional power in its own right). In 1840, Crete was returned to direct Ottoman rule, followed by an unsuccessful 1841 uprising in support of Union with independent Greece. Another uprising in 1858 secured some privileges, such as the right to bear arms, equality of Christian and Muslim worship, and the establishment of Christian councils of elders with jurisdiction over education and customary and family law. These concessions were resented by the Cretan Muslims, though Christians pressed for more, while maintaining their ultimate aim of union with Greece.

== Revolt ==
Flag used during the siege of Arkadi. Inspired by the Greek flag, it featured the initials of the motto "Crete, Enosis, Freedom or Death", and the cross with the inscription "Jesus Christ Wins."

As tensions ran high in the island, and several petitions to the Sultan went unanswered, armed bands were formed, and the uprising was officially proclaimed on 21 August 1866. The revolt caused immediate sympathy in Greece, but also elsewhere in Europe. The rebels initially managed to gain control of most of the hinterland although as always the four fortified towns of the north coast and the southern town of Ierapetra remained in Ottoman hands.

By the mid-19th century, the Ottomans had ruled Crete for more than 220 years since Crete had been captured from Venetians, despite frequent bloody uprisings by Cretan rebels. While the Cretans rose against the Ottoman occupation during the War of Greek Independence, the London Protocol of 1830 dictated that the island could not be a part of the new Greek state.

On 30 March 1856, the Treaty of Paris obligated the Sultan to apply the Hatti-Houmayoun, which guaranteed civil and religious equality to Christians and Muslims. The Ottoman authorities in Crete were reluctant to implement any reform. Before the majority of Muslim conversions (the majority of the former Christians had converted to Islam and then recanted), the Empire tried to recant on liberty of conscience. The institution of new taxes and a curfew also added to the discontent. In April 1858, 5,000 Cretans met at Boutsounaria. Finally an imperial decree on 7 July 1858 guaranteed them privileges in religious, judicial and financial matters. One of the major motivations of the revolt of 1866 was the breach of the Hatti-Houmayoun.

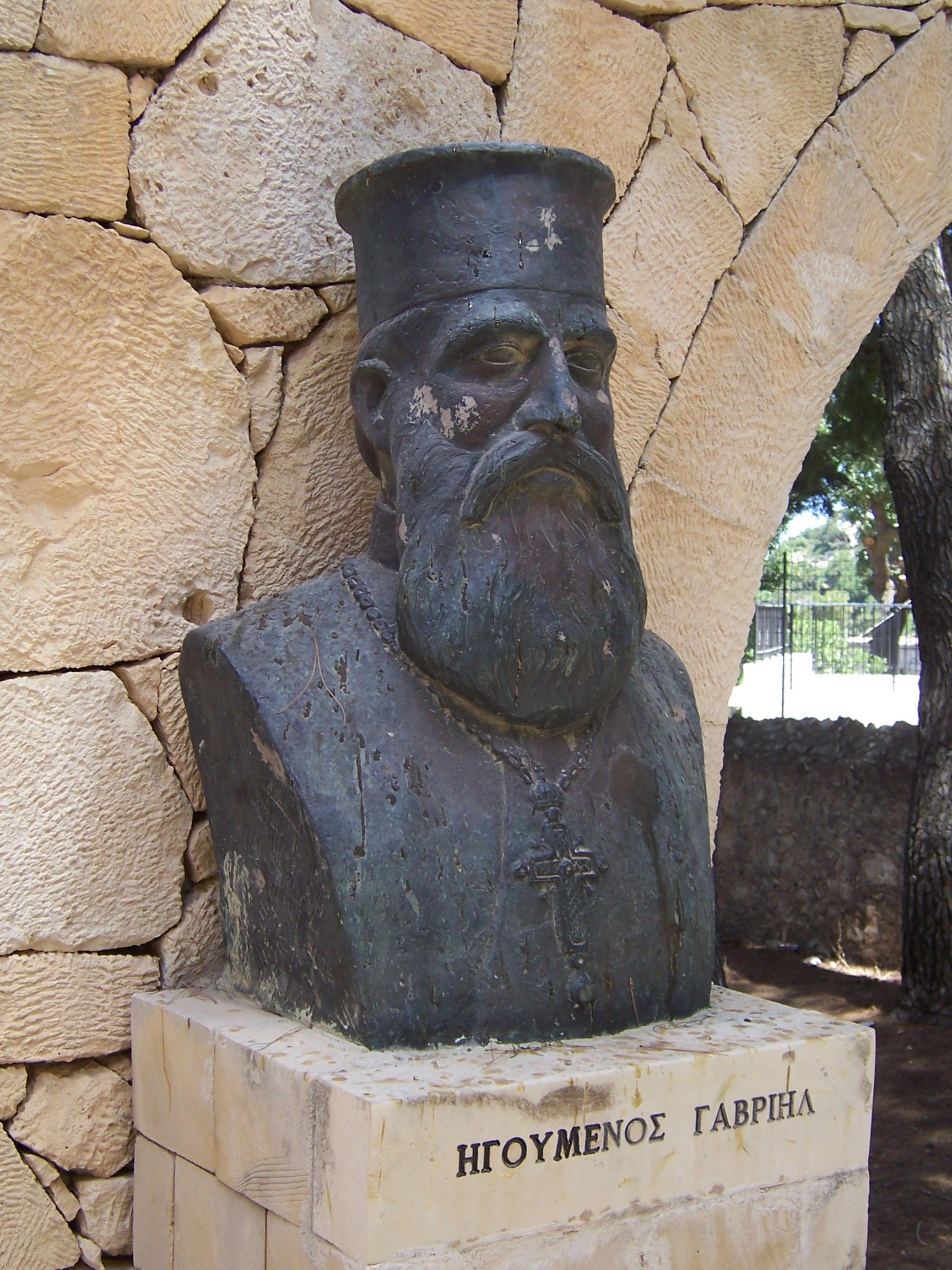
Bust of the igumen Gabriel

A second cause of the insurrection of 1866 was the interference of Hekim Ismail Pasha, wāli of Crete, in an internal quarrel about the organization of the Cretan monasteries. Several laymen recommended that the goods of the monasteries come under the control of a council of elders and that they be used to create schools, but they were opposed by the bishops. Ismail Pasha intervened and designated several people to decide the subject and annulled the election of "undesirable" members, imprisoning the members of the committee that had been charged with going to Constantinople for presenting the subject to the Patriarch. This intervention provoked violent reactions from the Christian population of Crete.

=== Arkadi ===
One particular event caused strong reactions among the liberal circles of western Europe, the "Holocaust of Arkadi". The event occurred in November 1866, as a large Ottoman force besieged the Arkadi Monastery, which served as the headquarters of the rebellion. In addition to its 259 defenders, over 700 women and children had taken refuge in the monastery. After a few days of hard fighting, the Ottomans broke into the monastery. At that point, the rebel Kostis Giaboudakis set fire to the gunpowder stored in the monastery's vaults, causing the death of most of the rebels and the women and children sheltered there. As reported by the American writer and consul William Stillman and others over the recently introduced telegraph, this event caused enormous shock in the rest of Europe and in North America and decreased the perceived legitimacy of Ottoman rule.

==== Context ====
In the spring of 1866, meetings took place in several villages. On 14 May an assembly was held in the Aghia Kyriaki monastery in Boutsounaria near Chania. They sent a petition to the Sultan and the consuls of the big powers in Chania. At the time of the first meetings of the revolutionary committees, the representatives were elected by province and the representative of the Rethymno region was the hegumen of Arkadi, Gabriel Marinakis.

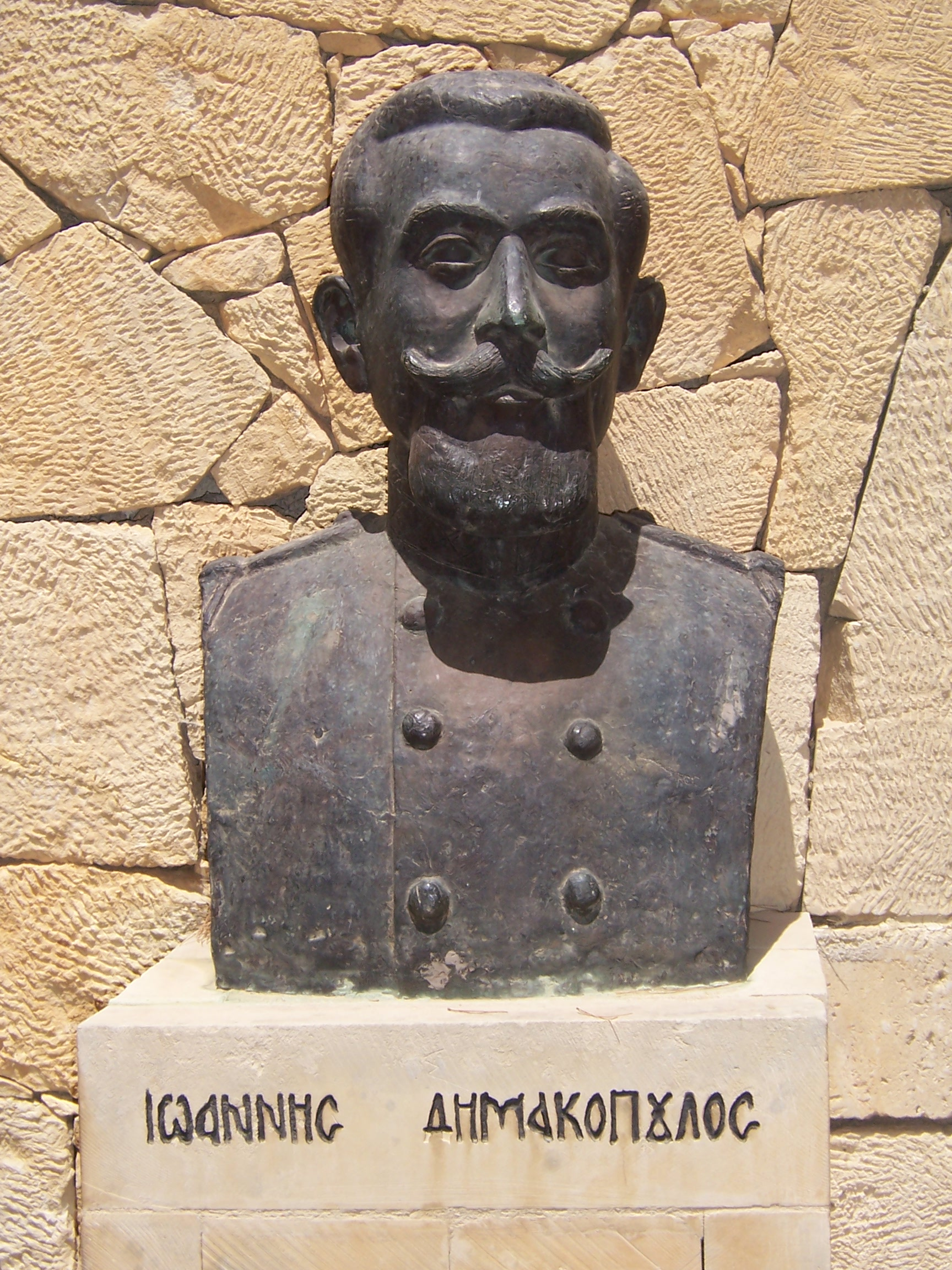
Ioannis Dimakopoulos

At the announcement of these nominations Ismail Pasha sent a message to the hegumen via the Bishop of Rethymno, Kallinikos Nikoletakis. The letter demanded that the higumen dissemble the revolutionary assembly or the monastery would be destroyed by Ottoman troops. In the month of July 1866, Ismail Pasha sent his army to capture the insurgents, but the members of the committee fled before his troops arrived. The Ottomans left again after destroying icons and other sacred objects that they found in the monastery.

In September, Ismail Pasha sent the hegumen a new threat of destroying the monastery if the assembly did not yield. The assembly decided to implement a system of defense for the monastery. On 24 September, Panos Koronaios arrived in Crete and landed at Bali. He marched to Arkadi, where he was made commander-in-chief of the revolt for the Rethymno region. A career military man, Koronaios believed that the monastery was not defensible. The hegumen and the monks disagreed and Koronaios conceded to them, but advised the destruction of the stables so that they could not be used by the Ottomans. This plan was ignored. After having named Ioannis Dimakopoulos to the post of commander of the garrison of the monastery, Koronaios left. At his departure, numerous local residents, mostly women and children, took refuge in the monastery, bringing their valuables in hopes of saving them from the Ottomans. By 7 November 1866, the monastery sheltered 964 people: 325 men, of which 259 were armed, the rest women and children.

==== Arrival of the Ottomans ====
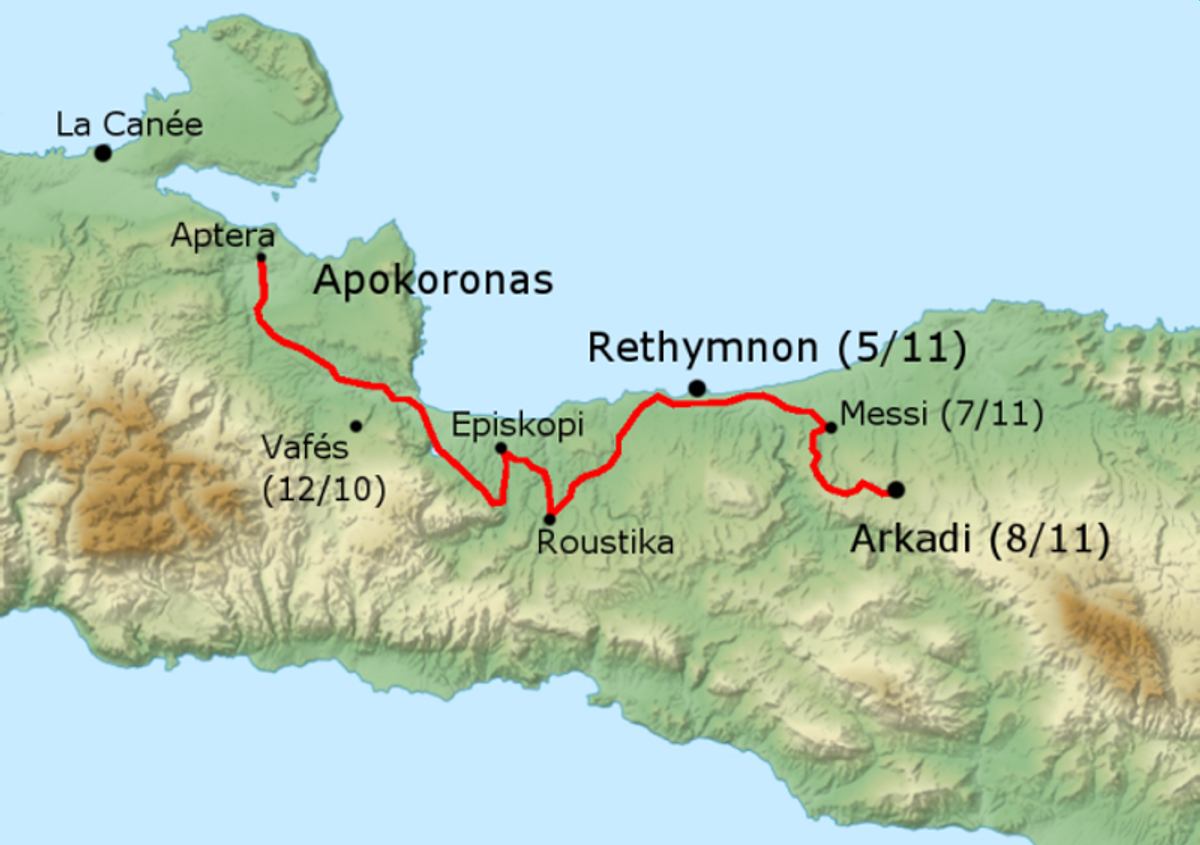
Route taken by Mustafa Pasha of Apokoronas to Arkadi

Since the mid-October victory of Mustafa Pasha's troops at Vafes, the majority of the Ottoman army was stationed in Apokoronas and were particularly concentrated in the fortresses around the bay of Souda. The monastery refused to surrender, so Mustafa Pasha marched his troops on Arkadi. First, he stopped and sacked the village of Episkopi. From Episkopi, Mustafa sent a new letter to the revolutionary committee at Arkadi, ordering them to surrender and informing them that he would arrive at the monastery in the following days. The Ottoman army then turned toward Roustika, where Mustafa spent the night in the monastery of the prophet Elie, while his army camped in the villages of Roustika and Aghios Konstantinos. Mustafa arrived in Rethymno on 5 November, where he met Ottoman and Egyptian reinforcements. The Ottoman troops reached the monastery during the night of 7–8 November. Mustafa, although he had accompanied his troops to a site relatively close, camped with his staff in the village of Messi.

==== Egyptian Intervention ====
In late 1866 Isma'il Pasha (Egypt's Khedive) sent an Egyptian military contingent to aid the Ottoman Empire in putting down the rebellion. The contingent was made up of 16,000 infantry troops under the command of Emirliva (major-general) Ismail Shaheen Pasha and was transported by the Egyptian Navy. Due to the ineffectiveness of the Ottoman Navy's siege of the island, guns and equipment were smuggled by sea from Greece to the Cretan rebels, which lengthened the siege of the Cretan capital and raised casualties on the Egyptian side. In mid-1867, Khedive Isma'il Pasha removed Shaheen Pasha from command of the Egyptian forces and replaced him by a more experienced officer, Emirliva Ismail Sadiq Pasha, who on 6 October 1867 successfully defeated the Cretan rebels in their capital.

==== Attack ====
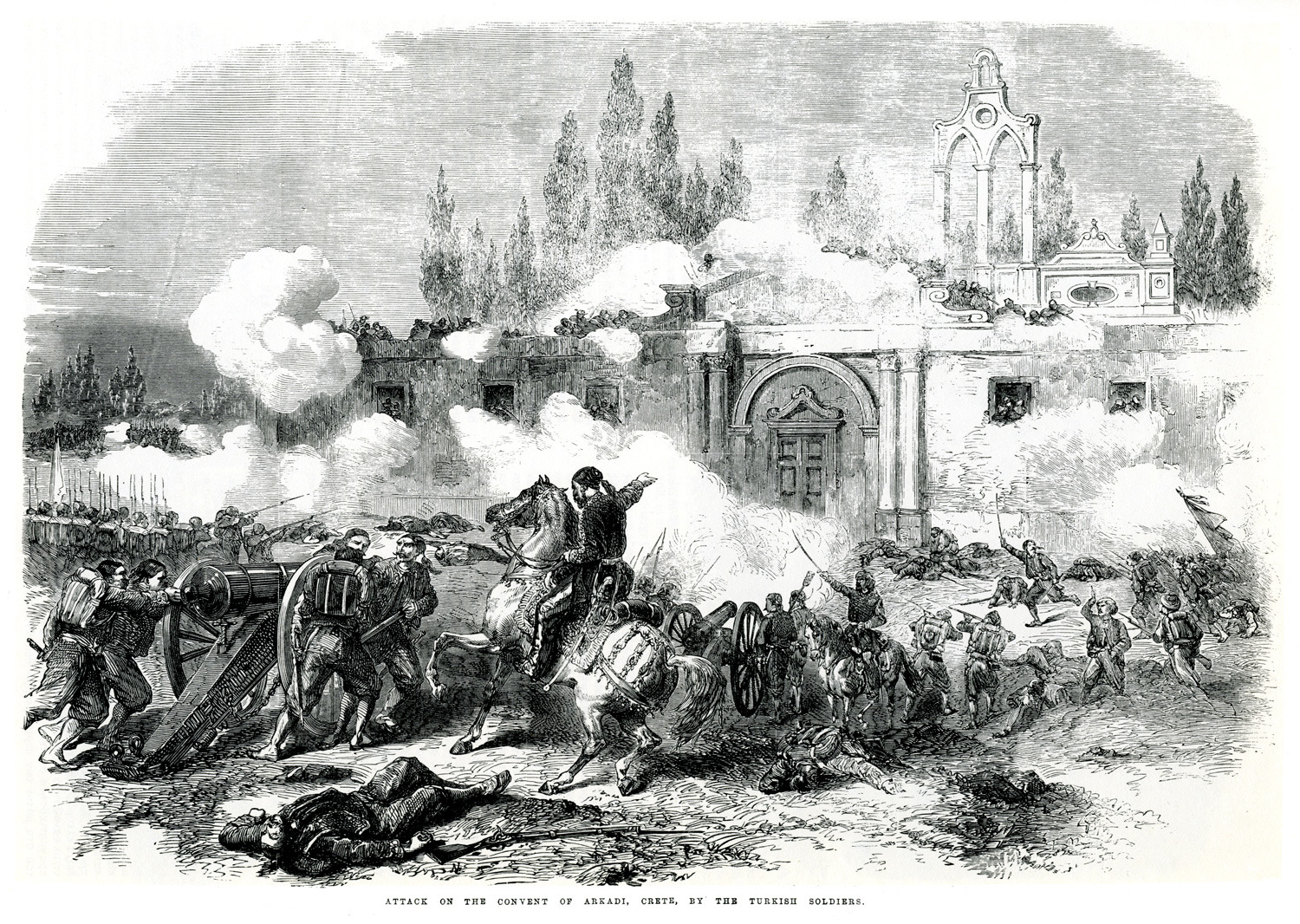
The Turks attack

On the morning of 8 November, 1866, an army of 15,000 Ottoman soldiers and 30 cannons, directed by Suleyman, arrived on the hills of the monastery while Mustafa Pasha waited in the Messi. Suleyman, positioned on the hill of Kore to the north of the monastery sent a last request for surrender. He received only gunfire in response.

The assault was begun by the Ottoman forces. Their primary objective was the main door of the monastery on the western face. The battle lasted all day without the Ottomans infiltrating the building. The besieged had barricaded the door and, from the beginning, taking it would be difficult. The Cretans were relatively protected by the walls of the monastery, while the Ottomans, vulnerable to the insurgents' gunfire, suffered numerous losses. Seven Cretans took their position within the windmill of the monastery. This building was quickly captured by the Ottomans, who set it on fire, killing the Cretan warriors inside.

The battle stopped with nightfall. The Ottomans received two heavy cannons from Rethymno, one of which was called Koutsahila. They placed them in the stables. On the side of the insurgents, a war council decided to ask for help from Panos Koronaios and other Cretan leaders in Amari. Two Cretans left by way of the windows by ropes and, disguised as Muslims, crossed the Ottoman lines. The messengers returned later in the night with the news that it was now impossible for reinforcements to arrive in time because all of the access roads had been blocked by the Ottomans.

Combat began again in the evening of 9 November. The cannons destroyed the doors and the Ottomans made it into the building, where they suffered more serious losses. At the same time, the Cretans were running out of ammunition and many among them were forced to battle with only bayonets or other sharp objects. The Ottomans had the advantage.

==== Destruction ====
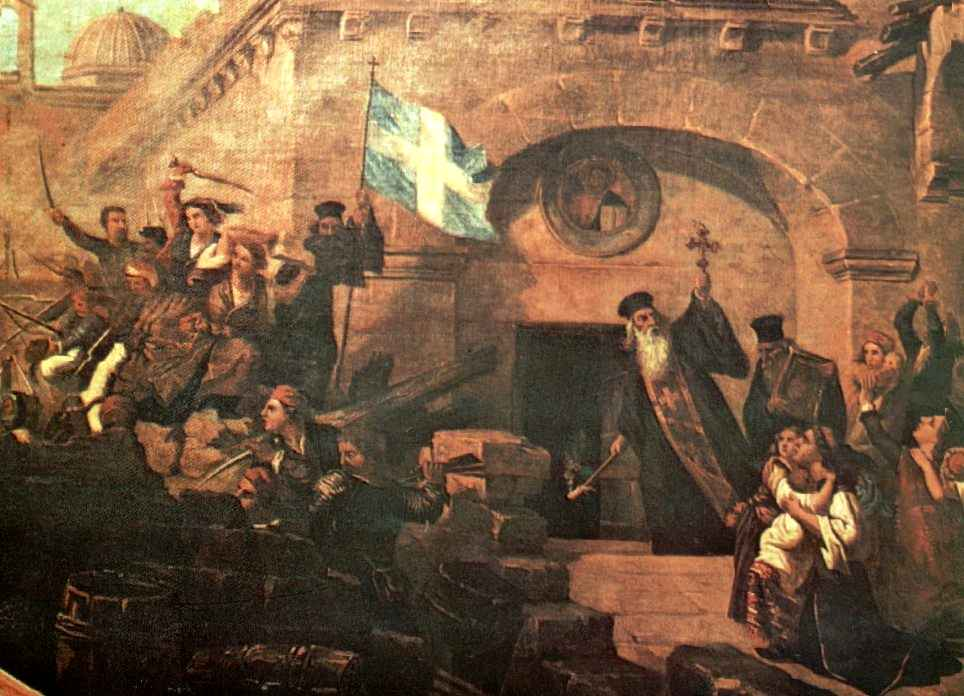
The hegumen Gabriel gathering the besieged near the powder magazine

The women and children inside the monastery were hiding in the powder room. The last Cretan fighters were finally defeated and hid within the monastery. Thirty-six insurgents found refuge in the refectory, near the ammunitions. Discovered by the Ottomans, who forced the door, they were massacred.

In the powder room, where the majority of the women and children hid, Konstantinos Giaboudakis gathered the people hiding in the neighbouring rooms together. When the Ottomans arrived at the door of the powder room, Giaboudakis set the barrels of powder on fire and the resulting explosion resulted in the deaths of numerous Ottoman soldiers.

In another room of the monastery holding an equal number of powder barrels, insurgents made the same gesture. But the powder was humid and only exploded partially, so it only destroyed part of the northwest wall of the room.

Of the 964 people present at the start of the assault, 864 were killed in combat or at the moment of the explosion. 114 men and women were captured, but three or four managed to escape, including one of the messengers who had gone for reinforcements. The hegumen Gabriel was among the victims. Tradition holds that he was among those killed by the explosion of the barrels of powder, but it is more likely that he was killed on the first day of combat. Ottoman losses were estimated at 1500. Their bodies were buried without memorials and some were thrown in the neighboring gorges. The remains of numerous Cretan Christians were collected and placed in the windmill, which was made into a reliquary in homage to the defenders of Arkadi. Among the Ottoman troops, a group of Coptic Egyptians were found on the hills outside the monastery. These Christians had refused to kill other Christians. They were executed by the Ottoman troops, and their ammunition cases left behind.

Some 114 survivors were taken prisoner and transported to Rethymno where they were subjected to numerous humiliations from the officers responsible for their transport, but also by the Muslim population who arrived to throw stones and insults when they entered the city. The women and children were imprisoned for a week in the church of the Presentation of the Virgin. The men were imprisoned for a year in difficult conditions. The Russian consulate had to intervene to require Mustafa Pasha to keep basic hygienic conditions and provide clothing to the prisoners. After one year, the prisoners were released.

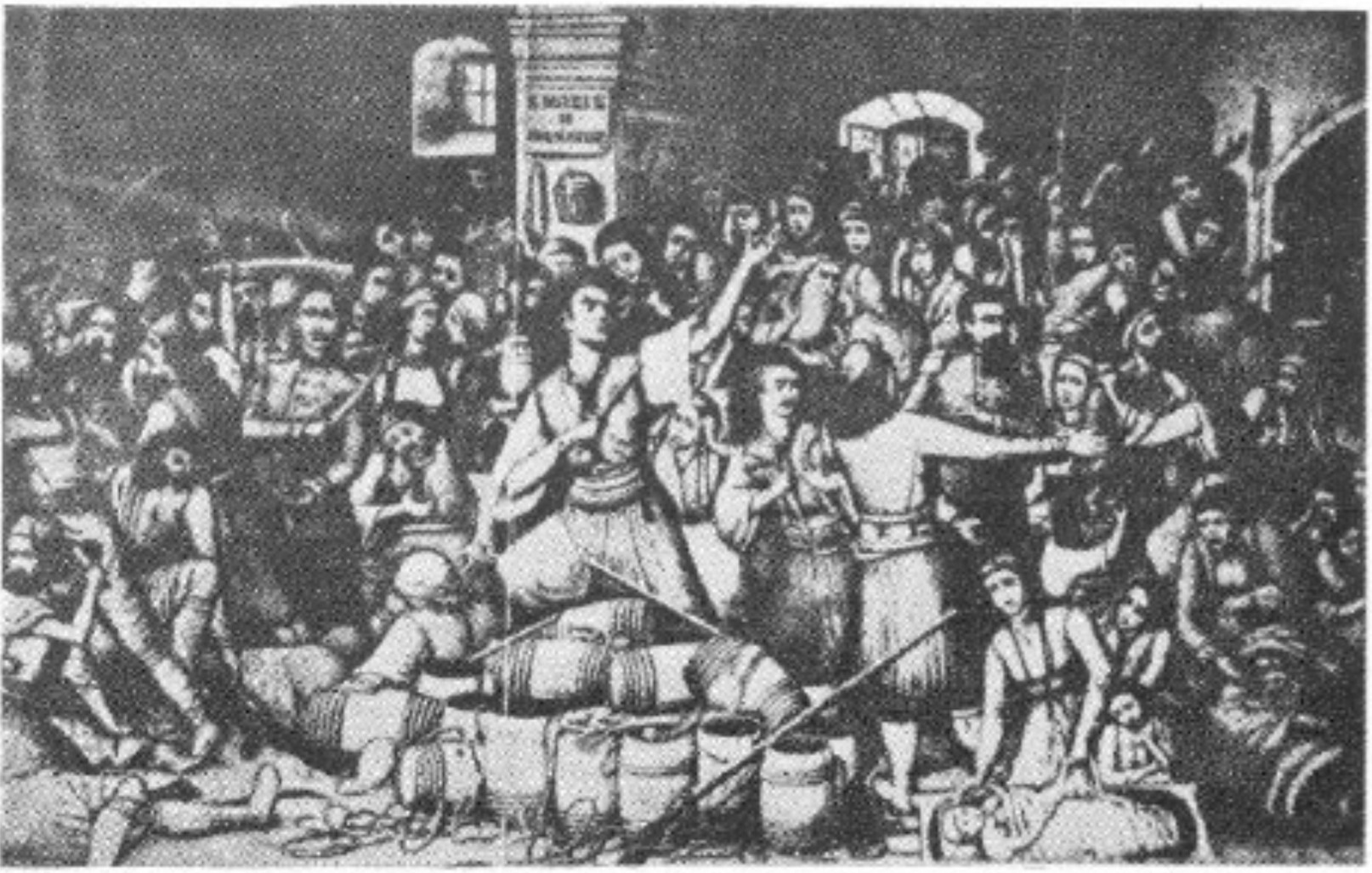
Konstantinos Giaboudakis preparing the powder barrels

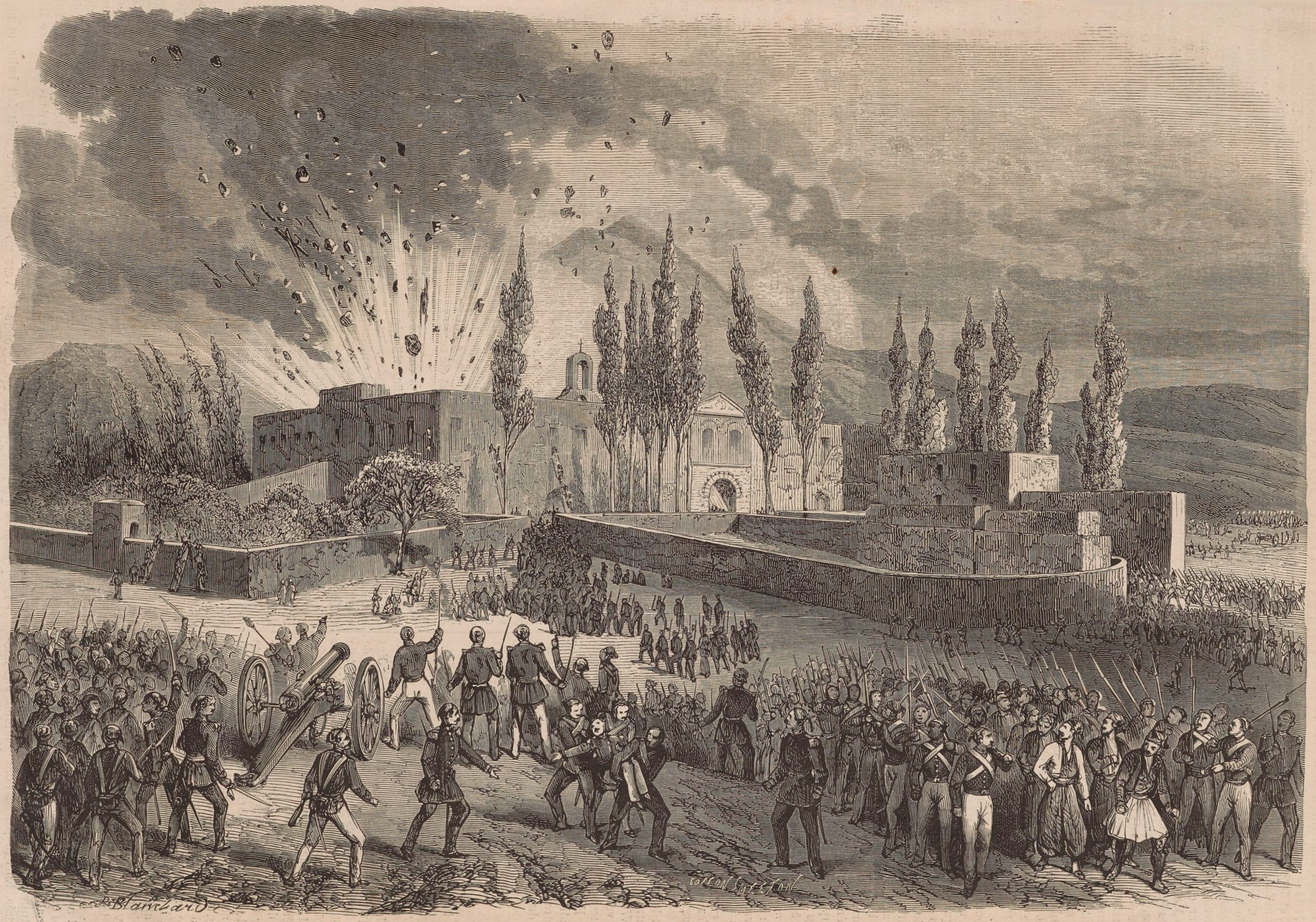
The explosion of the powder room

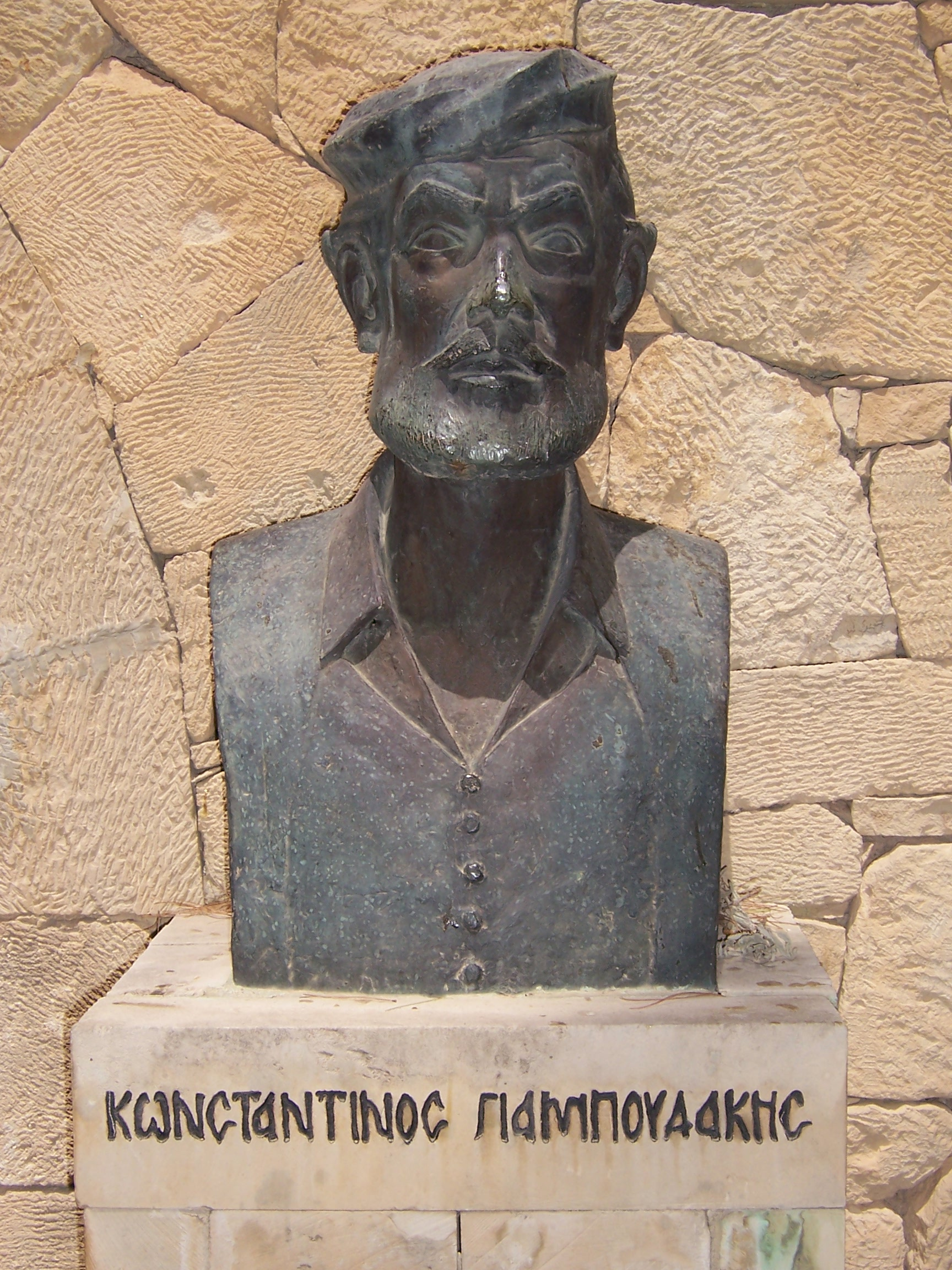
Konstantinos Giaboudakis

==== International reaction ====
The Ottomans considered taking Arkadi a big victory and celebrated it with cannon fire. However, the events at Arkadi provoked indignation among the Cretans, but also in Greece and abroad. The tragedy of Arkadi turned world opinion on the conflict. The event recalled the Third Siege of Missolonghi and the numerous Philhellenists of the world were in favor of Crete. Volunteers from Serbia, Hungary and Italy arrived on the island. Gustave Flourens, a teacher at the Collège de France, enlisted and arrived in Crete by the end of 1866. He formed a small group of philhellenists with three other Frenchmen, an Englishman, an American, an Italian and a Hungarian. This group published a brochure on The question of the Orient and the Cretan Renaissance, contacted French politicians and organized conferences in France and in Athens. The Cretans named him a deputy at the assembly, but he turned the position down.

Giuseppe Garibaldi, in his letters, praised the patriotism of the Cretans and their wish to gain their independence. Numerous Garibaldians, moved by an ardent philhellenism, came to Crete and participated in several battles. Letters written by Victor Hugo were published in the newspaper Kleio in Trieste, which contributed to the worldwide reaction. The letters gave encouragement to the Cretans and told them that their cause would succeed. He emphasized that the drama of Arkadi was no different than the Destruction of Psara and the Third Siege of Missolonghi. He described the tragedy of Arkadi:

In writing these lines, I am obeying an order from on high; an order that comes from agony. [...]
One knows this word, Arkadian, but one hardly understands what it means. And here are some of the precise details that have been neglected. In Arkadia, the monastery on Mount Ida, founded by Heraclius, 6,000 Turks attacked 197 men and 343 women and also children. The Turks had 26 cannons and two howitzers, the Greeks had 240 rifles. The battle lasted two days and two nights; the convent had 1,200 holes found in it from cannon fire; one wall crumbled, the Turks entered, the Greeks continued the fight, 150 rifles were down and out and yet the struggle continued for another 6 hours in the cells and the stairways, and at the end there were 2,000 corpses in the courtyard. Finally, the last resistance was broken through; the masses of the Turks took the convent. There only remained one barricaded room that held the powder and, in this room, next to the altar, at the center of a group of children and mothers, a man of 80 years, a priest, the higumen Gabriel, in prayer...the door, battered by axes, gave and fell. The old man put a candle on the altar, took a look at the children and the women and lit the powder and spared them. A terrible intervention, the explosion, rescued the defeated...and this heroic monastery, that had been defended like a fortress, ended like a volcano.

Not finding the necessary solution from the big European powers, the Cretans sought aid from the United States. At this time, the Americans tried to establish a presence in the Mediterranean and showed support for Crete. The relationship grew as they looked for a port in the Mediterranean and they thought, among others, to buy the island of Milo or Port Island. The American public was sympathetic. The American philhellenes arrived to advocate for the idea of Cretan independence, and in 1868, a question of recognition of independent Crete was addressed in the House of Representatives, but it was decided by a vote to follow a policy of non-intervention in Ottoman affairs.

=== Aftermath of Arkadi ===
Because the loss of Crete might have been the prelude to a much more serious loss of Ottoman territory in the Balkans, the Ottoman Grand Vizier, Âli Pasha, arrived in the island in October 1867 and remained there for four months. A'ali set in progress a low profile district by district reconquest of the island followed by the construction of blockhouses or local fortresses across the whole of it. These were the basis of continued Ottoman military rule until the final crisis of 1896–1898.

More importantly, he designed an Organic Law which gave the Cretan Christians equal (in practice, because of their superior numbers, majority) control of local administration. He thus gained the minimum of political cooperation needed to retain control of the island by early 1869 and almost all the rebel leaders had submitted to Ottoman rule though some, notably the pro-Russian Hadjimichaelis, remained in exile in Greece.

== In fiction ==
The Cretan revolt is referenced in Jules Verne's 1870 novel Twenty Thousand Leagues Under the Seas, written while the revolt was going on. Verne's Captain Nemo is mentioned as using his submarine Nautilus to provide "4,000 lb. weight of gold" to the rebels. This passage clearly indicates the sympathy of Verne to the rebels' cause.

The revolt is mentioned in the novel Freedom and Death by Nikos Kazantzakis. In this work, the explosion of the monastery is attributed to the actions of a relative of the novel's protagonist, Captain Michalis.
