= Panos Koronaios =

Greek Army officer (1809–1899)

- Πάνος Κορωναίος
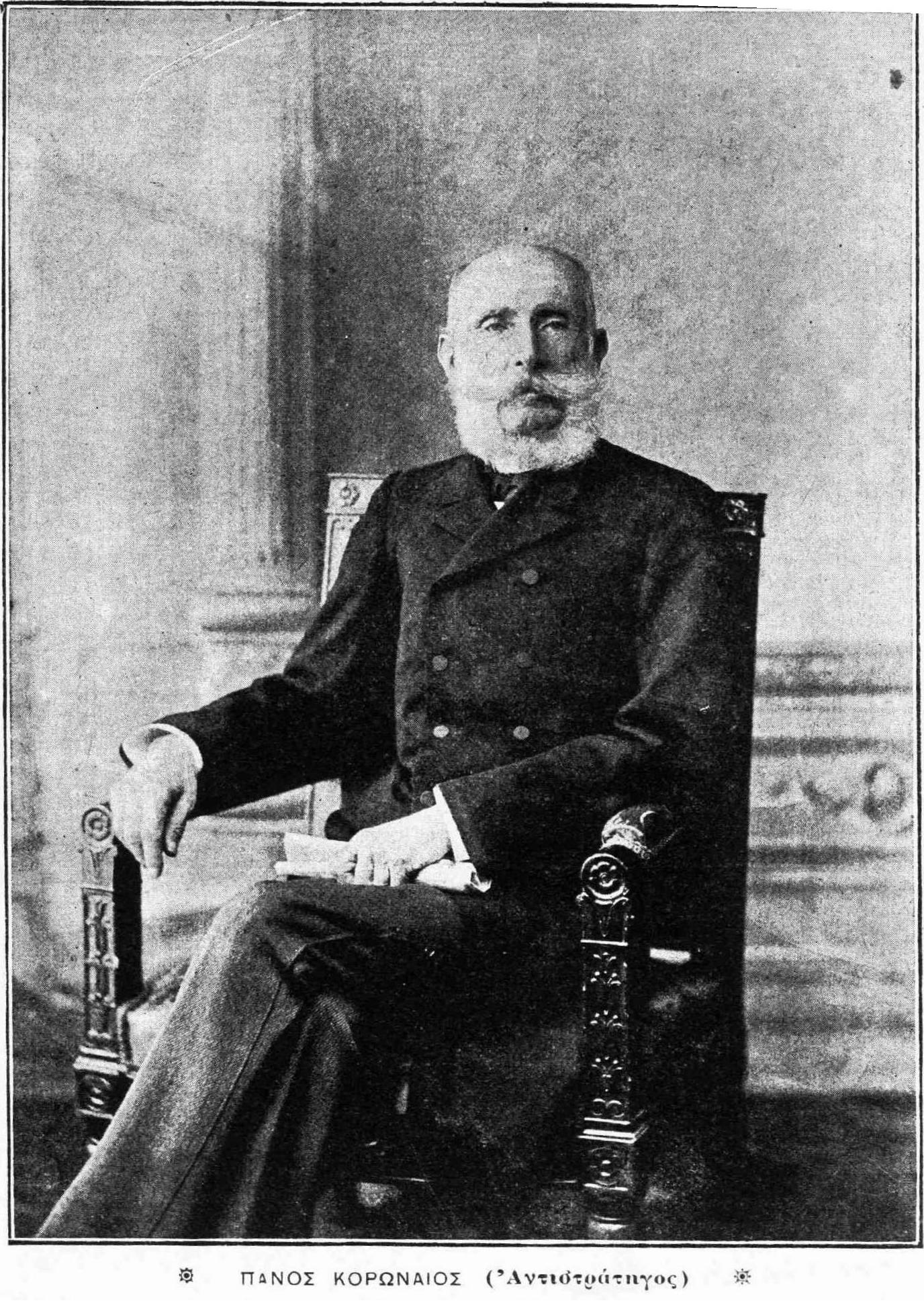
- A photograph of Panos Koronaios at an advanced age

Minister of Military Affairs
- In office June 1863 – July 1863
- Monarch: George I
- Prime Minister: Benizelos Roufos
- In office April 1864 – March 1864
- Monarch: George I
- Prime Minister: Konstantinos Kanaris

Personal details
- Born: 1809 Constantinople, Ottoman Empire (now Istanbul, Turkey)
- Died: 29 January 1899 (aged 89–90) Athens, Kingdom of Greece
- Education: Hellenic Military Academy

Military service
- Allegiance: First Hellenic Republic; Kingdom of Greece
- Branch/service: Hellenic Army
- Rank: Lieutenant General
- Commands: Head of Athens National Guard
- Battles/wars: Greek War of Independence; Chios expedition; 23 October 1862 Revolution; Cretan revolt (1866–1869); Holocaust of Arkadi Monastery

Panos Koronaios (Greek: Πάνος Κορωναίος) was a Hellenic Army officer who reached the rank of lieutenant general, and a prominent military leader in the overthrow of King Otto of Greece in 1862 and in the Cretan Revolt of 1866–1869.

He was born in Constantinople in 1809, to a family that hailed from Kythira and the Mani Peninsula. Following the outbreak of the Greek War of Independence in 1821, his family left the Ottoman capital and settled in Corfu. At the age of 17, Koronaios left Corfu and joined the small regular army of the Greek rebels. Under the command of Colonel Rodios, he fought in the failed Chios expedition of 1827–28.

When the Hellenic Military Academy was established in 1828, he entered as one of the first students, and was commissioned the first Greek artillery officer with the rank of adjutant.

Due to his opposition to the authoritarian rule of King Otto, he was sent away from Athens to serve in Nafplion. There he was one of the chief leaders of the unsuccessful Nauplian Revolution in February 1862, and later one of the chief drivers of Otto's ouster in October 1862. He was a representative during the II National Assembly, and during the subsequent Interregnum period, he emerged as one of the leading military figures, particularly due to his influence on the artillery. During the bloody clashes of June 1863 between the "Mountain" and "Plain" factions, Koronaios, who had sided with the former, was named head of the Athens National Guard and Minister of Military Affairs, and led his forces to victory after three days of fighting.

When the Cretan Revolt of 1866–1869 broke out, he left Greece and joined the Cretan rebels, remaining on the island for about two years. After his return, he entered politics, being successively elected as a Member of Parliament for Attica in 1869, and Kythira in 1877 (replacing the deceased MP D. Raptakis), 1879, and 1887. In 1880, during the near-war with the Ottoman Empire, he was promoted to lieutenant general, and then retired from active duty.

He died at Athens in 1899.
