= Castor =

Castor most commonly refers to:

- Castor (star), in the constellation Gemini
- Castor, a genus name of the beaver
- Castor, one of the Dioscuri/Gemini twins Castor and Pollux in Greco-Roman mythology
- Caster or castor, a small undriven wheel

Castor or CASTOR may also refer to:

== Clothing ==
- Castor (cloth), a woolen fabric
- Castor gloves, made from the skin of lambs or deer
- Castor hat
- Castore (brand), a British sportswear and athletic clothing company

== Fictional entities ==
- Castor Oyl, fictional character in the Popeye cartoons
- Castor Troy, fictional character in the 1997 movie Face/Off, portrayed by Nicolas Cage and John Travolta
- Castor, fictional character in the video game Spartan: Total Warrior
- Lord Castor, fictional character in the 2007 movie The Harpy
- Castor, fictional character in Tron: Legacy, portrayed by Michael Sheen
- "Castor, Gobernador" fictional character in The Courts of the Morning by John Buchan
- "Castor Wilds" fictional location in The Legend of Zelda: The Minish Cap by Nintendo
- "Castor", fictional persona in the video game Persona 3. Castor is used by one of the playable characters, Shinjiro Aragaki
- Project Castor, a set of male clones in the TV series Orphan Black

== People ==
=== Given name ===
==== Ancient ====
- Castor of Rhodes, Greek grammarian and rhetorician
- Drusus the Younger (13 BC – 23 CE), Roman consul, son of the Emperor Tiberius, nicknamed "Castor"
- Antonius Castor, ancient botanist
- Saint Castor, the name of several Christian saints:
  - Castor of Apt (died c. 420), French bishop of Apt
  - Castor of Karden (died c. 400), German priest and hermit

==== Modern ====
- Castor Cantero (1918–?), Paraguayan football player
- Castor McCord (1907–1963), American jazz saxophonist
- Castor (footballer) (born 1979), Edmilson Ferreira, Brazilian footballer

=== Surname ===
- Betty Castor (born 1941), American educator and politician
- Brian Castor (1889–1979), English cricketer
- Bruce Castor (born 1961), American lawyer and politician
- George A. Castor (1855–1906), American politician
- Helen Castor (born 1968), English historian
- Jean-Victor Castor (born 1962), French politician
- Jimmy Castor (1940–2012), American musician
- Kathy Castor (born 1966), American politician
- Stacey Castor (1968–2016), American murderer
- Steve Castor (born 1972/1973), American lawyer

== Places ==
=== Canada ===
- Castor, Alberta, Canada
- Queue de Castor River, Eeyou Istchee Baie-James, Jamésie, Nord-du-Québec, Canada
- Rivière aux Castors Noirs, river in Quebec, Canada
- Castor River (Ontario), Canada

=== United States ===
- Castor, Louisiana, Louisiana
- Castor Creek (Little River tributary), Louisiana
- Castor High School, Castor, Louisiana
- Castor River (Missouri)
- Castor Temple, a summit in the Grand Canyon

=== Elsewhere ===
- Castor (mountain), in the Pennine Alps on the border between Switzerland and Italy
- Castor Bay, Auckland, New Zealand
- Castor, Cambridgeshire, England
- Castor, an old name for Caistor St. Edmund, Norfolk, England
- Castor (crater) on Saturn's small moon Janus

== Science and technology ==
=== Biology ===
- Castor oil plant, castor bean plant
  - Castor oil, oil of the castor bean
  - Castor wax, produced from castor oil
- Castoreum, scented exudate produced by beavers

=== Other uses in science and technology ===
- Castor (rocket stage), a family of solid-fuel rocket stages
- Castor (software), a data binding framework for Java
- CASTOR (nuclear waste), a proprietary cask
- CASTOR experiment, "Centauro and Strange Object Research" at CERN
- CASTOR (spacecraft), a proposed space telescope
- Caster or castor angle, relevant to a steered wheel

== Vessels ==
- HMS Castor, the name of more than one ship of the British Royal Navy
- HSwMS Castor, the name of more than one ship of the Swedish Navy
- Castor (1782 ship), a vessel launched in 1782 that made one voyage to Bengal for the British East India Company and that was last listed in 1808
- P901 Castor, a Belgian patrol ship
- Castor (1917 ship), a 1917 Polish tugboat

== Other uses ==
- Castor (band), an American rock band
- Castor (trucks), a brand used by Swedish truck manufacturers Tidaholm in the 1910s
- Castor Cracking Group, a Swedish music group
- Caster sugar, fine sugar

== See also ==
- Caistor, a town and civil parish situated in the West Lindsey district of Lincolnshire, England
- Caster (disambiguation)
- Castro (disambiguation)
- Gastor (disambiguation)
- Kastor (disambiguation)
