= Gastor =

Gastor may refer to:

- El Gastor, a city in Cádiz Province, Spain
- MV Gastor, an LNG carrier built by Chantiers de l'Atlantique
- Global Automotive Summit Toronto, a yearly event for the Automotive software industry
- Gastor Tana Toraja, an Indonesian football club

== People with the surname ==
- Diego del Gastor (1908–1973), Spanish flamenco guitarist

== See also ==
- Castor (disambiguation)
- Kastor (disambiguation)
- Gastro-, common English-language prefix derived from the ancient Greek γαστήρ gastēr ("stomach")
