= Kastor =

Kastor may refer to:

- Castor and Pollux, twin brothers in Greek and Roman mythology
- Kastor und Pollux, a complex of two towers in Frankfurt, Germany, named after the mythological characters
- Kastor of Rhodes, a Greek grammarian and rhetorician
- Kastor, an unrelated character in the 2002 video game Age of Mythology

Kastor is also the surname of:

- Adolph Kastor, a founder of Camillus Cutlery Company
- Deena Kastor (born 1973), an American long-distance runner

== See also ==
- Castor (disambiguation)
- Gastor (disambiguation)
- Kastro (disambiguation)
