= HSwMS Castor =

HSwMS Castor is the name of the following ships of the Swedish Navy

- HSwMS Castor (1909), a 1.-class torpedo boat
- HSwMS Castor (T124), a Spica-class torpedo boat launched in 1965 and decommissioned 1985

== See also ==
- Castor (disambiguation)
