= Kastro =

Kastro may refer to:

== Places ==
- Kastro, a town in the municipality of Kastro-Kyllini in Greece
- Kastro, Thasos, a small village on the island of Thasos in Greece
- (Vryo)Kastro, presumed (pre)historical capital of Kythnos island (Cyclades, Aegean Greece)
- Kastro, Grevena, a village in West Macedonia, Greece
- Kavousi Kastro), a Late Bronze-Early Iron Age settlement near the modern village of Kavousi in eastern Crete
- Kastros, a Neolithic settlement on the island of Cyprus

== People ==
- Kastro (rapper) (born 1976), an American rapper and member of Tupac Shakur's rap group, Outlawz
- Kastro Zizo (born 1984), an Albanian musician
- Kastro (Hunter × Hunter), a fictional character in the manga series Hunter × Hunter

== See also ==
- Castro (disambiguation)
- Kastor (disambiguation)
- Gastro-, common English-language prefix derived from the ancient Greek γαστήρ gastēr ("stomach")
