= HMS Castor =

Four ships of the Royal Navy have borne the name HMS Castor. Named after one of the Gemini twins in Greek mythology. Castor also means "he who excels".

- HMS Castor (1781) was a 36-gun fifth rate that HMS Flora captured from the Dutch in 1781. One month later the French Frippone captured Castor off Cadiz.
- HMS Castor (1785) was a 32-gun fifth rate launched in 1785. She was briefly in French hands in 1794, but was recaptured. She was sold in 1819.
- HMS Castor (1832) was a 36-gun fifth rate launched in 1832. In 1860 she became a training ship, and was sold for breaking up in 1902.
- HMS Castor (1915) was a C-class light cruiser launched in 1915. She was sold in 1936.
