= Castor (footballer) =

Brazilian footballer (born 1979)

Personal information
- Full name: Edmilson Ferreira
- Date of birth: March 10, 1979 (age 47)
- Place of birth: Curitiba, Brazil
- Height: 1.77 m (5 ft 10 in)
- Position: Attacking midfielder

Team information
- Current team: Operário (MS)

Senior career*
Years	Team	Apps	(Gls)
1996–1999	Coritiba (PR)		
1999	C.F. Os Belenenses		
2000	Iraty (PR)		
2001	Joinville (SC)		
2002	Grêmio Maringá (PR)		
2003	Atlético (PR)		
2004	União Rondonópolis (MT)		
2005	Mineiros (GO)		
2006	Gama (DF)		
2007	Ponte Preta (SP)		
2007	Ituano (SP)		
2007	Caxias (RS)		
2008	XV de Novembro (RS)		
2008	Metropolitano (SC)		
2008	Santa Helena		
2009	Sampaio Corrêa		
2010	Trindade		
2011	Operário (MS)		
- * Club domestic league appearances and goals as of 14 April 2008

Edmilson Ferreira, also known as Castor (born March 10, 1979) is a Brazilian footballer who plays as an offensive midfielder for Operário (MS)

In 2008, he joined Daejeon Citizen, but due to a contract issue, Daejeon Citizen did not register him in the K League.
