= CASTOR (spacecraft) =

Proposed UV/blue-optical space observatory

- Mission type: Astronomy
- Operator: Canadian Space Agency
- Mission duration: 5 years minimum

Spacecraft properties
- Launch mass: 1063 kg
- Payload mass: 618 kg

Start of mission
- Launch date: late 2020s

Orbital parameters
- Reference system: Geocentric
- Regime: Sun-synchronous orbit
- Altitude: 800 km

Main telescope
- Type: Three-mirror anastigmat
- Diameter: 1.0 m
- Wavelengths: From 150 nm (ultraviolet) to 550 nm (visible light)

Instruments
- wide-field imaging, slitless spectroscopy, DMD spectroscopy, precision photometry

The Cosmological Advanced Survey Telescope for Optical and UV Research (CASTOR) is a proposed space telescope mission led by the Canadian Space Agency. With its 1-meter diameter primary mirror, CASTOR would provide imaging capabilities in the ultraviolet (UV) and blue-optical regions at a spatial resolution similar to that of the Hubble Space Telescope (FWHM of 0.15 arcseconds), but over an instantaneous field of view about 100 times larger. CASTOR was selected as Canada's highest priority for space astronomy in the 2020s in the 2020 Long Range Plan for Canadian Astronomy.

== Description ==
CASTOR will complement the upcoming Nancy Grace Roman Space Telescope, Euclid space telescope, and Vera C. Rubin Observatory. These three major wide-field imaging facilities will not have access to the UV portion of the electromagnetic spectrum. CASTOR has been specifically designed to provide this missing capability, with high sensitivity and observing efficiency at UV and blue-optical wavelengths.

Using dichroics, CASTOR would enable simultaneous imaging of three bandpasses (UV from 150 to 300 nm, u from 300 to 400 nm, and g from 400 to 550 nm) over an instantaneous field of view of 0.25 square degrees. In addition to its imaging capabilities, CASTOR will also be equipped with additional instruments enabling high-precision photometry for the monitoring of bright targets, as well as two spectroscopic modes: low-spectral-resolution slitless spectroscopy over the entire imaging field and configurable DMD spectroscopy to provide intermediate resolution spectra in the UV in a parallel field.

== Objectives ==
Specific science drivers of CASTOR include:

- Studying dark energy and dark matter by enabling precise photometric redshift measurements
- Echo mapping of active galactic nuclei
- Characterization of star formation histories on sub-galactic scales
- Characterization of the chemical enrichment history of nearby galaxies and star clusters
- Identification and characterization of new galactic satellites and stellar streams
- UV characterization of multi-messenger events
- Reconstruction of the stellar formation history of the Milky Way using white dwarfs and identification of white dwarfs polluted by rocky debris from their own planetary systems
- Characterization of the chromospheric activity of M dwarfs
- Characterization of exoplanet atmospheres
- Identification of distant Trans-Neptunian objects
