= Brian Castor =

English cricketer

Brian Kenneth Castor (21 October 1889 – 2 October 1979) was a British Guiana-born English cricketer who played for Essex. He was born in Mahaica and died in Maida Hill.

Castor made one first-class appearance for Essex during the 1932 season, in a game against Cambridge University. In the single innings in which Castor played, he put on thirteen runs before being bowled out. Two years previously Castor had lined up for Essex against Sir J. Cahn's XI.

He was secretary of Essex from 1930 to 1946 and of Surrey from 1947 to 1957. Of his time at Surrey, David Lemmon wrote:

He was firm but kind to staff and players and active and influential throughout the game. He was rather gruff in manner, but there was great humour in the man as evidenced by his public address announcements to the pigeons who had invaded the outfield. Booming over the loudspeaker would come the order: "Go away, you pigeons. Go to Lord's!'

During World War II, he was a Japanese prisoner-of-war from 1942 to 1945.
