= Louis Dega =

Character in the book and movie Papillon

Louis Dega (sometimes written Louis Delga III) is the name of a character in Henri Charrière's novel Papillon. In the 1973 film this character was played by Dustin Hoffman and in the 2017 film the role was played by Rami Malek. Purportedly an autobiography, few of the characters and events in Papillon could be corroborated and it is perhaps best regarded as a narrative novel, combining and embellishing the adventures of Charrière and several fellow inmates, in particular of René Belbenoît and Charles Brunier.

In the book, Dega is introduced as one who "had been caught up in the scandal of the counterfeit National Defense bonds", had become rich and "one of the biggest crooks" in the Marseille underworld, but was exposed as the lead forger in 1929 by one "Brioulet", an arrested partner in this crime, when Dega had refused to help him to pay for a lawyer. He was sentenced to 15 years' imprisonment on Devil's Island, where he became a companion of Charrière for 13 years. The two were first sent to a prison in Caen, where they made a deal in which Dega paid Papillon for protection, until they embarked for South America in 1932. Dega's younger brother Joseph tried to help Charrière escape from Barranquilla prison in Colombia. The two became best friends during their sentence.

There was a real bonds counterfeit scandal, for which multiple people were arrested in Metz in 1925, the main forger among them one Fernand Royer born in Paris in 1881, but the names Dega or Brioulet were not associated with it. Dega likely is a fusion of two or more people Charrière had met or read about.
