= Toussaint (leper chief) =

Toussaint (c. 1890 – after 1934) was the chief of a leper colony in South America, known for his appearance in the novel Papillon. The semi-autobiographical novel recounts the escape of Henri Charrière from the French penal colony of Devil's Island in French Guiana. In 1934, Charrière, with his fellow prisoners Clusiot and Maturette, escaped from the penal colony. During their escape, they went to Toussaint's leper colony to obtain money and a boat.

Toussaint was a Frenchman, and is believed to have himself served time at Devil's Island. He contracted leprosy, most likely while in the penal colony. Toussaint was sent to a leper colony on Chacachacare, and stayed in the colony for the rest of his life.

He was portrayed by Anthony Zerbe under heavy makeup in the film Papillon (1973).
