= Banco (novel) =

1972 book by Henri Charrière

- First edition (French)
- Author: Henri Charrière
- Translator: Patrick O'Brian
- Language: French
- Series: Papillon
- Genre: Autobiography
- Publisher: Robert Laffont
- Publication date: 1972
- Publication place: France
- Preceded by: Papillon
- Followed by: Magnificent Rebel

Banco is a 1972 autobiography by French writer Henri Charrière, it is a sequel to his previous novel Papillon. It documents Charrière's life in Venezuela, where he arrived after his escape from the penal colony on Devil's Island.

== Synopsis ==
Continuing on from Papillon, Banco relates Henri's life in Venezuela attempting to raise funds to seek revenge for his false imprisonment and to see his father. After many failed enterprises, including diamond mining, a bank robbery and a jewellery heist, he found success in Venezuela running various restaurants. The book provides more detail about the crime he was falsely accused and convicted of committing in France, his arrest, trial and views on French justice. Towards the end of the book, he returns to France as a free man.

== Reception ==
In The Pittsburgh Press, critic John Murphy noted that the story was "told with frankness, humor and feeling" and stated that "Banco shows dramatically how a man can maintain his dignity through a most humiliating personal experience and emerge from it to say with more conviction than ever, 'I am a man.'"

== Adaptations ==
- Papillon (2017), film directed by Michael Noer, based on novels Papillon and Banco
