= Papillon (2017 film) =

Film by Michael Noer

- Theatrical release poster
- Directed by: Michael Noer
- Screenplay by: Aaron Guzikowski
- Based on: Papillon by Henri Charrière; Banco by Henri Charrière; Papillon by Dalton Trumbo; Lorenzo Semple Jr.
- Produced by: Joey McFarland; David Koplan; Ram Bergman; Roger Corbi
- Starring: Charlie Hunnam; Rami Malek; Roland Møller; Yorick van Wageningen; Eve Hewson
- Cinematography: Hagen Bogdanski
- Edited by: John Axelrad; Lee Haugen
- Music by: David Buckley
- Production companies: Czech Anglo Productions; Ram Bergman Productions; FishCorb Films; Red Granite Pictures
- Distributed by: Bleecker Street (United States); Blitz (Serbia and Montenegro)
- Release dates: September 9, 2017 (TIFF); August 24, 2018 (United States)
- Running time: 133 minutes
- Countries: Malta; Montenegro; United States; Serbia
- Languages: English; French
- Box office: $10.1 million

Papillon is a 2017 biographical crime drama film directed by Michael Noer and written by Aaron Guzikowski. It tells the story of French convict Henri Charrière (Charlie Hunnam), nicknamed Papillon ("butterfly"), who was falsely imprisoned in 1933 in the notorious Devil's Island penal colony and escaped in 1941 with the help of another convict, counterfeiter Louis Dega (Rami Malek). The film's screenplay is based on Charrière's autobiographies Papillon and Banco, as well as the former's 1973 film adaptation, which was written by Dalton Trumbo and Lorenzo Semple Jr. and starred Steve McQueen and Dustin Hoffman.

Papillon premiered on September 9, 2017, in the Special Presentations section at the 2017 Toronto International Film Festival. It was also the last film to be produced by Red Granite Pictures before the company was closed thereafter in 2018.

== Plot ==
Henri "Papillon" Charrière, a safecracker from the Parisian underworld, is framed for murder. Though he has an alibi from his lover, Nenette, Papillon is convicted and condemned to the notorious Devil's Island penal colony in French Guiana — a hellish prison from which nobody has escaped.

On the ship to South America, Papillon meets Louis Dega, a quirky counterfeiter from Marseille. That evening Dega is awakened as two convicts murder a prisoner sleeping next to him in order to cut open his stomach and steal the money he had swallowed. Papillon forms an unlikely alliance with Dega, who is targeted by the other prisoners who suspect him of also hiding money. Papillon saves Dega's life and is punished for fighting by the guards. In exchange for Papillon's protection, Dega agrees to finance Papillon's escape, ultimately resulting in a bond of lasting friendship.

When Papillon and Dega are ordered to carry away a guillotined body, a guard starts to whip Dega. Papillon strikes the guard with a rock and runs into the jungle for his first escape. He is given two years of silent solitary confinement. After the warden learns he has been receiving extra food, his rations are cut in half until he gives up the name of his supplier. Papillon does not betray Dega.

The second escape plan is made from the prison infirmary, while Papillon is feigning insanity from his confinement. Dega does the warden's bookkeeping and has money to fund the escape. Celier has a connection to get a boat, and the sexually abused Maturette is the fourth to join the dangerous venture. Dega drugs the guards using pills meant to sedate a supposedly insane Papillon and the three others escape over the walls to the jungle, with Dega injuring his leg in the process, to reach a boat Dega paid for. As a storm approaches, it is clear they will not all survive in the small leaky boat. Celier wants to kill the injured Dega but Papillon defends Dega, who stabs and kills Celier as he fights with Papillon. After a treacherous storm destroys their boat, the three survivors find themselves being cared for in a Colombian convent. Their apparent freedom is short lived. The Colombian authorities arrive, kill Maturette, and return Papillon to Royal Island, where he is subjected to five years in solitary confinement. Dega is sent to Devil's Island.

Papillon is released from solitary as a weathered older man and sent to Devil's Island, where the high cliffs provide a natural barrier for escape attempts. He finds Dega who has adjusted to prison life and has no interest in escape. Because a fall from the cliffs would mean certain death, Papillon bags coconuts together for a raft. During a swell of waves, he jumps from the cliffs and survives the fall. The third escape is a success and he is a free man. He writes a memoir based on his time in prison and escape attempts.

The movie postscript reads: "Over 80,000 prisoners were condemned to the penal colony in French Guiana, most of whom never returned to France. Henri Charriere's autobiography 'Papillon' became the number one bestseller for 21 weeks in France. To date, it has sold over 13 million copies in 30 languages. In 1970, the French Minister of Justice signed a decree allowing Charriere to return to France. For the remainder of his life, he lived a free man. The penal colony in French Guiana did not survive him".

== Cast ==
- Charlie Hunnam as Henri "Papillon" Charrière
- Rami Malek as Louis Dega
- Christopher Fairbank as Jean Castilli
- Yorick van Wageningen as Warden Barrot
- Roland Møller as Celier
- Tommy Flanagan as Masked Breton
- Joel Basman as André Maturette
- Eve Hewson as Nenette
- Michael Socha as Julot
- Brian Vernel as Guittou
- Ian Beattie as Toussaint
- Nicholas Asbury as Commandant
- Nikola Kent as Deputy Warden Brioulet
- Slavko Sobin as El Caiman
- Luka Peroš as Santini
- Demetri Goritsas as Jean-Pierre Castelnau

== Production ==
Papillon was shot in different locations around Europe including Montenegro, Malta, and Belgrade, Serbia.

== Release ==
Papillon was released in the United States by Bleecker Street on August 24, 2018.

== Reception ==
=== Box office ===
The film debuted to $1.2 million from 544 theaters in its opening weekend, finishing 16th. As of September 13, 2018, Papillon had grossed $2,335,896 in the United States and Canada, and $2,180,684 in other territories, for a total worldwide gross of $4,516,580.

=== Critical response ===
On Rotten Tomatoes the film has an approval rating of 52% based on reviews from 111 critics, with an average rating of 5.8/10. The website's critical consensus reads, "Papillon puts its own well-acted, solidly produced spin on a previously adapted tale, although it suffers in comparison to the 1973 version." On Metacritic, the film has a weighted average score of 51 out of 100, based on 31 critics, indicating "mixed or average reviews".

== See also ==
- Papillon (1973 film)
- Saint-Joseph Island
