= André Maturette =

French criminal and Papillon character (born 1914)

- Born: 1914; France
- Other name: Maturette
- Occupation: Criminal
- Known for: Prison sentence with Henri Charrière

André Maturette (born 1914) was a prisoner in the French Guiana prison colony of Devil's Island who attempted to escape with Henri Charrière and Joanes Clousiot.

== Biography ==
Maturette was born in France and was arrested in 1932 when he was seventeen for the murder of a taxi cab driver. He was originally sentenced to death by guillotine, but was later sentenced to life because of his young age.

In early 1933, Maturette was sent to the penal colony in French Guiana where he met Charrière and Joanes Clousiot, with whom he would eventually escape. In the early morning hours of 28 November 1933 the three escaped from the hospital in Cayenne prison and went to a leper colony, buying a boat from the lepers led by Toussaint.

Eventually, they were all recaptured in Colombia, and were returned to French authorities who sentenced them to two years solitary confinement. Clousiot died shortly after being released from solitary. Charrière survived solitary confinement and successfully escaped from Devil's Island on a bag of coconuts, while Maturette stayed in Royale working in the hospital.

In the 1950s, Maturette was living and married in Venezuela. In the 1973 film Papillon, he was portrayed by Robert Deman. In the 2017 film adaptation of the same name, directed by Michael Noer, Maturette (played by Joel Basman) is shot by Colombian policemen after having escaped to a native village.

== See also ==
- List of fugitives from justice who disappeared
