= George John Seaton =

English prisoner on Devil's Island

George John Seaton (born December 3, 1900, in France), was an English man who was sentenced to imprisonment on Devil's Island in French Guiana. Seaton was one of the last prisoners to escape the island before it was officially closed as a prison colony. After escaping his imprisonment, Seaton went into servitude for local farmers. His autobiography, published in the 1950s, details his experiences as a prisoner and freed man in French Guiana and was widely reviewed in both Britain and the United States.

== Early life ==
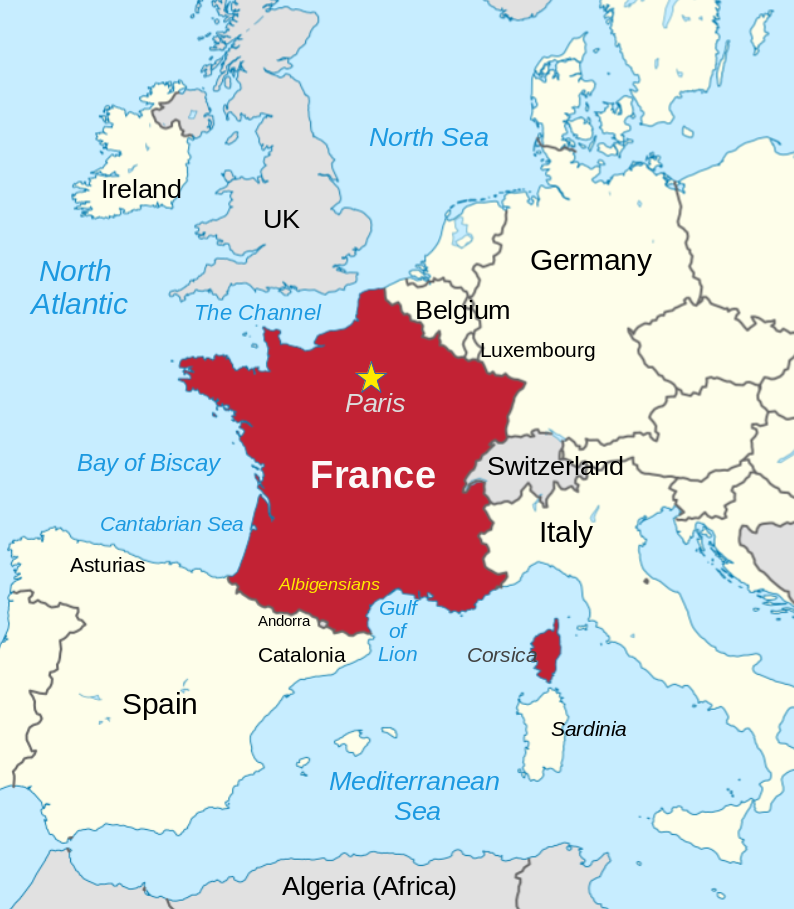
Map of France

Most details about Seaton's early life stem from his autobiography. Besides this recollection of childhood, there are no other records of Seaton in existence regarding his life before prison.

Seaton was born on December 3, 1900, in France. He was born at 24 Avenue du Bois on the corner of the rue Chalgrin. His mother was Beatrice Seaton, and his father is unknown. His mother was young when she had Seaton, and she chose to leave him to be raised by his grandmother.

His grandmother was a very wealthy woman. After the death of her father, Dr. Julius Wolfe, he left her nearly three quarters of a million pounds. For this reason, Seaton led a very extravagant childhood. When the First World War began, Seaton and his grandmother moved to England where they remained for several years.

As Seaton recalls in his autobiography, his grandmother was often busy with obligations or travels. He became rather reckless in his teenage years, but it was not unusual behavior for a male of his socioeconomic class or age. As a teenager, he began stealing from wealthy men and women. Eventually, he was arrested. His first arrest was at 17 years old. He was released soon after due to his prominent family's influence, but he was required to work on a ship as a deck boy to ensure his behavior reformed. His behavior continued despite the first offense and worsened with time. In 1919, his grandmother wrote him a letter letting him know that she could no longer spare any money to him. Seaton became impoverished and saw thievery as his way out. He was arrested in 1923, 1924, 1925, and then again in 1926. His sentences were for six months in French prison.

== Imprisonment ==
Penal colony hospital Isle Royal Island of the Salvation Islands French Guiana

Seaton's last arrest in 1926 led to his sentencing to hard labor on Devil's Island in French Guiana, a French overseas territory in South America near the West Indies and the Guianas. The establishment of Devil's Island as a penal colony goes back to France's Napoleonic Era, during which administrators turned to extreme punishment under maritime jurisdiction for criminals convicted of petty crimes such as theft and desertion.

It is unclear as to the exact crime he committed to be placed in captivity. In Seaton's autobiography, he asserts that he was punished for becoming a kleptomaniac, though he had no awareness of his behavior. He questions how it would be possible for him to when he had no moral values and no sense of right or wrong.

Upon his sentencing, Seaton recalls in his autobiography, he was marched onto a naval ship along with fifty other men who were chained together. The prisoners shuffled in a single file line through the center of La Rochelle to a ferry.

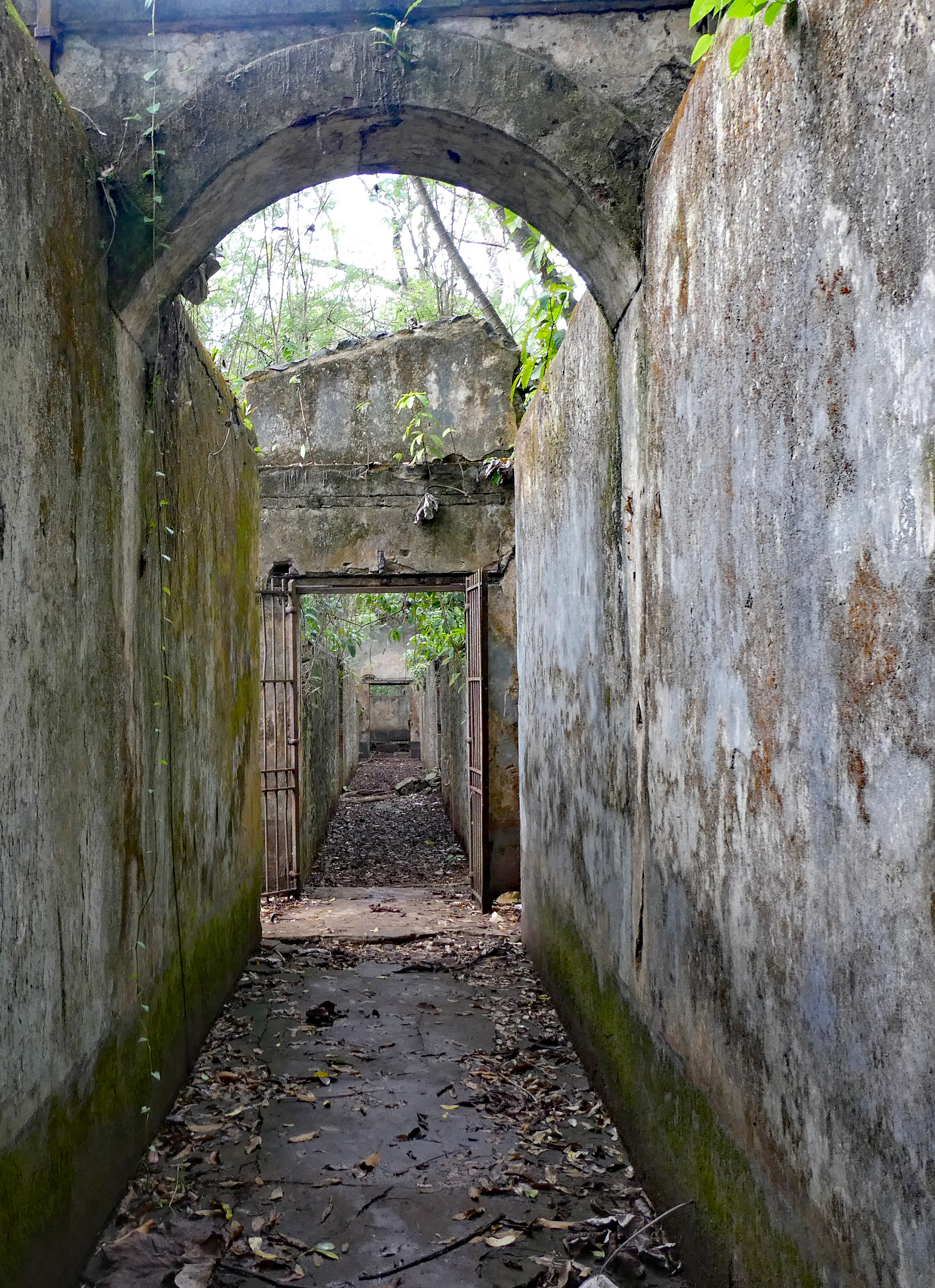
Prison on Devil's Island

Seaton was detained in the prison colony for 22 years. During his incarceration, Seaton claims, he became animalistic and uncivilized, obeying only the laws of survival. He was of the mere 25% of people who survived the island's merciless nature. Disease, rampant heat and humidity, overpopulated living, and lack of cleanliness caused high death rates amongst the prisoners. The guards were often ruthless, which also led to high mortality rates.

Seaton eventually escaped from prison but faced new challenges. Even when properly released, ex-prisoners on Devil's Island were not allowed to reenter France. Accordingly, they had to find work locally, and many ex-convicts turned to African farmers.

In 1949, Seaton made a deal with a black Frenchman named Belone to work for two dollars a month. Although Seaton had agreed to get paid, Belone told him he could work for free, or he would tell Devil's Island authorities he was causing issues, and his imprisonment would be reinstated. As a result, Seaton accepted work without pay.

One day after participating in heavy labor in Belone's service, Seaton snuck off to a nearby hospital where he escaped to freedom. He was, however, still exiled from both France and England.

== Publication of Seaton's autobiography ==
Once having escaped imprisonment and servitude, Seaton managed to publish his autobiography in 1951, which appeared as Isle of the Damned in the United States and as Scars Are My Passport in Britain. Both editions contain a foreword by Cyril Kersh, an English reporter with whom Seaton established contact from French Guiana and who assisted him in writing up his experiences. Their publication coincided with the last days of Devil's Island, which officially closed as an active penal colony in 1953.

The resulting book, which retells Seaton's life in the French penal colony from his own perspective, was heralded as "incredible" and a "must-be-read" that was "not to be missed" across the Anglophone sphere. Reviews highlighted the inhumanity of the French overseas prison system, going as far as to compare the operations on Devil's Island to Nazi concentration camps.

In light of the nascent civil rights movement in the United States, Seaton's interactions with Black prison guards and locals in particular captured the interest of African Americans. In his autobiography, Seaton mentions that the most humane among the guards on Devil's Island stemmed from France's North African army. According to him, their relative sympathy towards the prisoners may have been due to an age-old memory of slavery. Although they were severe enforcers of the rules, they did not, according to Seaton, enjoy beating prisoners in the same way as their white colleagues. Upon the publication of his autobiography, Jet Magazine highlighted Seaton's appreciation for the restrained nature of Black prison guards and prominently included him in a feature on "white slaves" in the French overseas territory.

The British edition of Seaton's autobiography was eventually banned by Ireland’s Censorship of Publications Board in 1952. The book was banned due to an overwhelming amount of homosexual behavior described by Seaton as part of prison life. At the time, the Board did not find it appropriate for the common people. For this reason, it was taken out of circulation. The Board consisted at that time of C. J. O’Reilly, Joseph Deery, a Roman Catholic priest, T. G. O'Sullivan, a district justice, John J. Pigott, a professor at St. Patrick's Training College, and C.J. Joyce, a solicitor.

Scars are my Passport contains an image of Seaton and twenty-six illustrations of Devil's Island and French Guiana. This is currently the only photo published of Seaton.

== Seaton's life as historical source ==
More recently, Seaton's life as told through his autobiography has served as a reliable primary source for historians and other social scientists, especially given that first-hand accounts from French Guiana are generally sparse and some, such as fellow prisoner Henri Charrière's, are considered largely falsified. Topics of analysis for which Seaton's autobiography has served as evidence range from general accounts of the effects of solitary confinement and homosexuality among prison populations to more specific inquiries into the rise of space engineering in French Guiana, the prisoners' day-to-day life on Devil's Island, and the fate of Chinese political prisoners in the penal colony.
