= Anthony Zerbe =

American actor

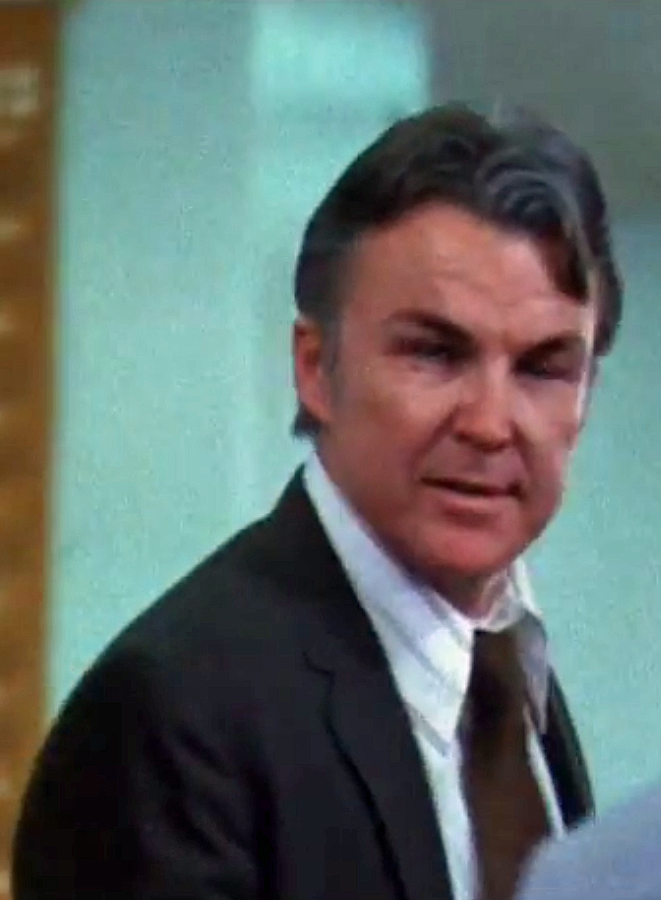
- Anthony Zerbe in trailer for The Laughing Policeman (1973)
- Born: Anthony Jared Zerbe; May 20, 1936 (age 90); Long Beach, California, U.S.
- Education: Pomona College
- Occupation: Actor
- Years active: 1963–present
- Spouse: Arnette Jens (m. 1962)
- Children: 2

Anthony Jared Zerbe (born May 20, 1936) is an American actor. After pursuing an interest in theater in his early years, including a stint at the Stella Adler Studio of Acting in New York City, he enlisted in the Air Force and later embarked upon a career in television and film.

On television, he appeared in many series, making multiple appearances in series such as Mission: Impossible, Gunsmoke, Kung Fu, Mannix, How the West Was Won and The Equalizer. He had recurring roles in the series Harry O and The Young Riders, garnering an Emmy Award in 1976 for his work on the former. His film credits include Cool Hand Luke (1967), The Omega Man (1971), Papillon (1973), The Dead Zone (1983), Licence to Kill (1989), Star Trek: Insurrection (1998),The Matrix Reloaded (2003), The Matrix Revolutions (2003) and American Hustle (2013).

== Life and career ==
Zerbe was born in Long Beach, California, the son of Arthur LeVan Zerbe and Catherine (née Scurlock). He attended Newport Harbor High School. He attended Pomona College in Claremont, California, graduating in 1958. His parents were also alumni of Pomona College. He served in the United States Air Force from 1959 to 1961.

=== Stage ===
Zerbe's interest in acting started with stage productions when he was 17. He studied at the Stella Adler Studio in New York City. He made his New York City stage debut at the Greenwich Mews Theatre on October 15, 1961 with The Cave Dwellers.

Zerbe is the former artistic director of Reflections, A New Plays Festival at the Geva Theatre in Rochester, New York, and toured the United States in 1981 with Behind the Broken Words, a performance of contemporary poetry, comedy, and dramatic works with fellow actor Roscoe Lee Browne. That same year, he played eldest brother Benjamin Hubbard in a Broadway revival of The Little Foxes.

=== Television ===
On television, Zerbe played guest roles on such series as Naked City, The Virginian, Kung Fu (2 episodes), The Big Valley, Route 66, The Wild Wild West, Twelve O'Clock High, Bonanza, Mission: Impossible (5 episodes), Gunsmoke (3 episodes, with one a double role), Hawaii Five-O, Mannix (4 episodes), It Takes a Thief, The Chisholms, Ironside, The F.B.I., The Rookies, The Rockford Files, Little House on the Prairie (1974 TV series), Dynasty, and Columbo, among others.

Zerbe appeared as the stentorian Lieutenant Trench, employing a distinctive sonorous baritone which bore no resemblance to his own voice, in the television series Harry O from the second half of the first season through the series' conclusion at the end of the second season. At the 28th Primetime Emmy Awards in 1976, Zerbe won an Emmy for Outstanding Continuing Performance by a Supporting Actor in a Drama Series for his role. He appeared in several miniseries, including Centennial, as Mervin Wendell, A.D., in which he portrayed Pontius Pilate, and North and South: Book II, as General Ulysses S. Grant. Zerbe later had a principal role as Teaspoon Hunter on the television series The Young Riders (1989–1992).

=== Film ===
Zerbe's film roles include an Irish Catholic coal miner and one of the titular characters in The Molly Maguires (1970); the post-apocalyptic cult commander Matthias in The Omega Man, a 1971 movie adaptation of Richard Matheson's 1954 novel I Am Legend; the leper colony chief Toussaint in the 1973 historical drama prison movie Papillon; a corrupt gambler in Farewell, My Lovely (1975); Rosie in The Turning Point (1977); Abner Devereaux in the television film Kiss Meets the Phantom of the Park (1978); villain Milton Krest in the James Bond movie Licence to Kill (1989); Roger Stuart in The Dead Zone (1983); Admiral Dougherty in Star Trek: Insurrection (1998); and Councillor Hamann in the 2003 films The Matrix Reloaded and The Matrix Revolutions. In 2013, he played Senator Horton Mitchell in the dark comedy/crime movie American Hustle. Zerbe played Mr. Crumwald in the 2014 Hungarian-American movie, Six Dance Lessons in Six Weeks.

== Personal life ==
Zerbe has been married to Arnette Jens (sister of actress Salome Jens), since October 7, 1962; the couple have two children.

== Selected filmography ==
=== Film ===
- 1967: Cool Hand Luke as "Dog Boy"
- 1967: Will Penny as "Dutchy"
- 1970: The Molly Maguires as Dougherty
- 1970: The Liberation of L.B. Jones as Willie Joe Worth
- 1970: They Call Me Mister Tibbs! as Rice Weedon
- 1971: The Omega Man as Jonathan Matthias
- 1972: The Hound of the Baskervilles (TV movie) as Dr. John Mortimer
- 1972: The Strange Vengeance of Rosalie as Fry
- 1972: The Life and Times of Judge Roy Bean as The Hustler
- 1973: Papillon as Toussaint
- 1973: She Lives! (TV movie) as "Dr. W"
- 1973: Carola (TV movie) as Campan
- 1973: The Laughing Policeman as Steiner
- 1974: The Parallax View as Professor Nelson Schwartzkopf (uncredited)
- 1975: Farewell, My Lovely as Laird Brunette
- 1975: Rooster Cogburn as "Breed"
- 1975: The Secret of the Pond as Sam
- 1977: The Turning Point as Rosie
- 1978: Child of Glass (TV movie)
- 1978: Who'll Stop the Rain as Antheil
- 1978: Kiss Meets the Phantom of the Park (TV movie) as Abner Devereaux
- 1980: Attica (TV movie) as William Kunstler
- 1980: The First Deadly Sin as Captain Broughton
- 1981: Soggy Bottom, U.S.A. as Morgan
- 1983: Return of the Man from U.N.C.L.E. as Justin Sepheran
- 1983: The Dead Zone as Roger Stuart
- 1986: Off Beat as Mr. Wareham
- 1986: Opposing Force as Becker
- 1986: One Police Plaza (TV movie) as Yakov Anderman
- 1987: P.I. Private Investigations as Charles Bradley
- 1987: Steel Dawn as Damnil
- 1989: Listen to Me as Senator McKellar
- 1989: See No Evil, Hear No Evil as Sutherland
- 1989: Licence to Kill as Milton Krest
- 1997: Touch as Father Donahue
- 1998: Star Trek: Insurrection as Admiral Matthew Dougherty
- 1999: True Crime as Henry Lowenstein
- 2003: Behind the Broken Words
- 2003: The Matrix Reloaded as Councillor Hamann
- 2003: The Matrix Revolutions as Councillor Hamann
- 2007: Veritas, Prince of Truth as Porterfield
- 2013: American Hustle as Senator Horton Mitchell
- 2014: Six Dance Lessons in Six Weeks as Mr. Crumwald
- 2016: The Investigation as Ash

=== Television ===
- Naked City (1963) – Phil Karshow
- The Big Valley (1965) – Gil Condon ("The Guilt of Matt Bentall")
- Mission: Impossible (1967) – David Redding ("The Photographer")
- The Wild Wild West (1967) – Deke Montgomery ("The Night of The Legion of Death")
- The Virginian (1968) – Jake Powell
- Gunsmoke (1968) – Skouras ("Blood Money")
- Mission: Impossible (1969) – Colonel Helmut Kellerman ("Live Bait")
- Mission: Impossible (1969) – Col. Alex Vorda ("The Amnesiac")
- Bonanza (1969) – John Spain ("A Ride in the Sun")
- Mannix (1969) – Chief Walt Finley ("Death in a Minor Key")
- Gunsmoke (1970) – Heraclio Cantrell and Father Hernando Cantrell ("Noonday Devil")
- Mission: Impossible (1970) – Eric Schilling ("The Amateur")
- Mission: Impossible (1971) – Reece Dolan ("The Connection")
- Ironside (1971) – Vincent Wiertel ("The Killer Priest Series")
- Mannix (1972) – James Conway ("Cry Silence")
- Cannon (1972, 1973) (three episodes)
- The Streets of San Francisco (1973) – Eddie Whitney
- Gunsmoke (1973) – Talbot ("Talbot")
- Kung Fu (1973, 1974) – Rafe / Paul Klempt
- Hawaii Five-O (1974) – Cord McKenzie ("Mother's Deadly Helper")
- Harry O (1975–1976) – Lt. KC Trench (30 episodes)
- Once an Eagle (1976) – Dave Shifkin
- How the West Was Won (1976–1977) – Martin Grey / Provost Marshal Captain Martin Grey (three episodes)
- The Red Hand Gang (1977) – Marco (five episodes)
- The Rockford Files (1978) – Jack Skowron ("The Gang at Don's Drive-In")
- Centennial (1978) – Mervin Wendell
- Little House on the Prairie (1982) – Dr. Joshua McQueen ("The Wild Boy")
- George Washington (1984) – General St. Pierre
- A.D. (miniseries) (1985) – Pontius Pilate
- Highway to Heaven (1985) – Jabez Stone ("The Devil and Jonathan Smith")
- Dream West (1986) – Bill Williams
- North and South, Book II (1986) – General Ulysses S. Grant
- The Equalizer (1987) – Phillipe Marcel ("Memories of Manon")
- The Equalizer (1988) – Phillipe Marcel ("The Mystery of Manon")
- Baja Oklahoma (1988) – Ole Jeemy Williams
- Onassis: The Richest Man in the World (1988) – Livanos
- Columbo (1989) – Max Dyson ("Columbo Goes to the Guillotine")
- The Young Riders (1989–1992) – Teaspoon Hunter
- Murder, She Wrote (1994) – Matt Matthews ("Murder of the Month Club")
- Tales from the Crypt (1994) – Arnie Grunwald ("Revenge is the Nuts")
- Walker Texas Ranger (1996) – Joey Galloway ("Break In")
- Asteroid (1997) – Dr. Charles Napier
- Frasier (2000) – Clifford ("RDWRER")
- Judging Amy (2004) – Judge Henry Sobel ("Accountability")
