= Charles Brunier =

French soldier, criminal, and possible Papillon character (1901–2007)

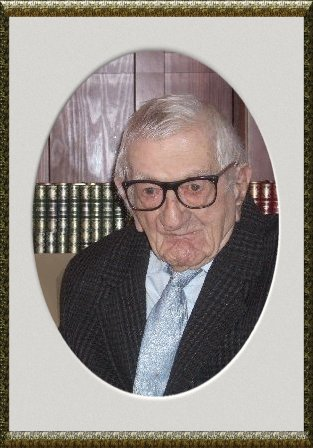
- Born: 31 May 1901; Paris, France
- Died: 26 January 2007 (aged 105); Paris, France
- Occupation: Soldier / Criminal
- Known for: Papillon

Charles Brunier (French pronunciation: [ʃaʁl bʁynje]; 31 May 1901 – 26 January 2007) was a French convicted murderer and veteran of both the First and Second World Wars, who claimed in 2005 to have been the inspiration for Papillon. Circumstantial evidence, including his butterfly tattoo and him having been on Devil's Island at the time, supported the claim.

== Biography ==
Born in Paris, Brunier served in Syria in 1918 and was wounded in action, also receiving the Croix de Guerre for saving a lieutenant's life. In 1923, however, he was accused of murder and armed robbery, and later convicted; his military medals were revoked as a result, and he was not on the official list of French World War I veterans although he did serve.

Brunier was sent to the penal colony off the coast of French Guiana. After the outbreak of World War II he escaped to Mexico and joined the Free French Forces as a fighter pilot, serving in the Battle of the Caribbean for two years before transferring to the infantry under Philippe Leclerc de Hauteclocque, and also in Africa (where Charles de Gaulle personally decorated him) and Italy; he was imprisoned again after the war, but released in 1948 in recognition of his services.

In 1992, Brunier moved into an old people's home in the suburbs of the French capital, where he lived until his death in 2007 at the age of 105.

== See also ==
- Henri Charrière (the author of Papillon)
