= Papillon (1973 film) =

Film by Franklin J. Schaffner

- Theatrical release poster by Tom Jung
- Directed by: Franklin J. Schaffner
- Screenplay by: Dalton Trumbo; Lorenzo Semple Jr.
- Based on: Papillon; 1969 novel by Henri Charrière
- Produced by: Robert Dorfmann; Franklin J. Schaffner
- Starring: Steve McQueen; Dustin Hoffman; Victor Jory; Don Gordon; Anthony Zerbe
- Cinematography: Fred J. Koenekamp
- Edited by: Robert Swink
- Music by: Jerry Goldsmith
- Production companies: Les Films Corona; General Production Company
- Distributed by: Allied Artists (United States and Canada); Columbia Pictures (International)
- Release date: December 16, 1973
- Running time: 150 minutes
- Countries: United States; France
- Languages: English; French; Spanish
- Budget: $13.5 million
- Box office: $53.2 million

Papillon is a 1973 historical adventure drama prison film directed by Franklin J. Schaffner. The screenplay by Dalton Trumbo and Lorenzo Semple Jr. was based on the 1969 autobiography by the French convict Henri Charrière. The film stars Steve McQueen as Charrière ("Papillon") and Dustin Hoffman as Louis Dega. Because it was filmed at remote locations, the film was expensive for the time ($12 million), but it earned more than twice that in its first year of release. The film's title is French for "Butterfly", referring to Charrière's tattoo and nickname.

== Plot ==
Henri Charrière is a safecracker nicknamed "Papillon" because of the butterfly tattoo on his chest. In France, he is wrongly convicted of murdering a pimp in 1933 and is sentenced to life imprisonment in French Guiana. On the way, he meets a fellow convict, Louis Dega, an infamous forger and embezzler. Papillon offers to protect Dega if he will fund the former's escape once they reach Guiana. Enduring the horrors of life in a jungle labour camp, the two become friends.

One day, Papillon defends Dega from a sadistic guard and escapes into the jungle but is captured and sentenced to two years in solitary confinement. In gratitude, Dega has extra food smuggled to Papillon. When the smuggling is discovered, the warden screens Papillon's cell in darkness for six months and halves his rations, but Papillon refuses to give up Dega's name. He is eventually released and sent to the infirmary in St-Laurent-du-Maroni to recover.

Papillon sees Dega again and asks him to arrange for another escape attempt. Dega helps him meet an inmate doctor who offers to secure a boat on the outside with the help of a man named Pascal. Fellow prisoner Clusiot and a gay orderly named André Maturette join the escape plot. During the escape, Clusiot is knocked unconscious by a guard. Dega subdues the guard and reluctantly joins Papillon and Maturette, climbing the walls to the outside. The trio meet Pascal, and they escape into the night. In the jungle the next day, Pascal delivers the prisoners to their boat, but after he leaves, the convicts discover it is fake. They encounter a local trapper who has killed the bounty hunters waiting for them. He guides the three to a leper colony, where they obtain supplies and a seaworthy boat.

The trio lands in Colombia and are accosted by a group of soldiers, who wound Maturette. He is captured along with Dega, while Papillon evades the soldiers and lives for a long period with a native tribe. He awakens one morning to find them gone, leaving him with a small sack of pearls. Papillon pays a nun to take him to her convent, where he asks the Mother Superior for refuge, but instead, she turns him over to the authorities.

Papillon is returned to French Guiana and sentenced to another five years of solitary confinement. He emerges a graying old man, along with Maturette, whom he sees just before the latter dies. Papillon is moved to the remote Devil's Island, where he reunites with Dega, now a farmer who has long given up hope of being released.

From a high cliff, Papillon observes a cove where he realizes the waves are powerful enough to carry a man out to sea and to the nearby mainland. Papillon persuades Dega to join him in another escape, and the men make two floats from bagged-up coconuts. Dega then decides not to escape and begs Papillon not to either. Papillon embraces Dega, then leaps from the cliff and is carried out to sea.

A narrator states that Papillon lived the rest of his life a free man, while the prison was closed some time before he died and ultimately reclaimed by nature.

== Cast ==
- Steve McQueen as Henri Charrière (also known as Papillon)
- Dustin Hoffman as Louis Dega
- Victor Jory as Indian chief
- Don Gordon as Julot
- Anthony Zerbe as Toussaint, leper colony chief
- Robert Deman as André Maturette
- Woodrow Parfrey as Clusiot
- Bill Mumy as Lariot
- George Coulouris as Dr. Chatal
- Ratna Assan as Zoraima
- William Smithers as Warden Barrot
- Val Avery as Pascal
- Gregory Sierra as Antonio
- Ron Soble as Santini
- Richard Farnsworth as Manhunter #1
- Dalton Trumbo as Commandant (once blacklisted by Hollywood, is the screen writer for Papillon) who states "France has disposed of you" actually an autobiographical comment.

== Production ==
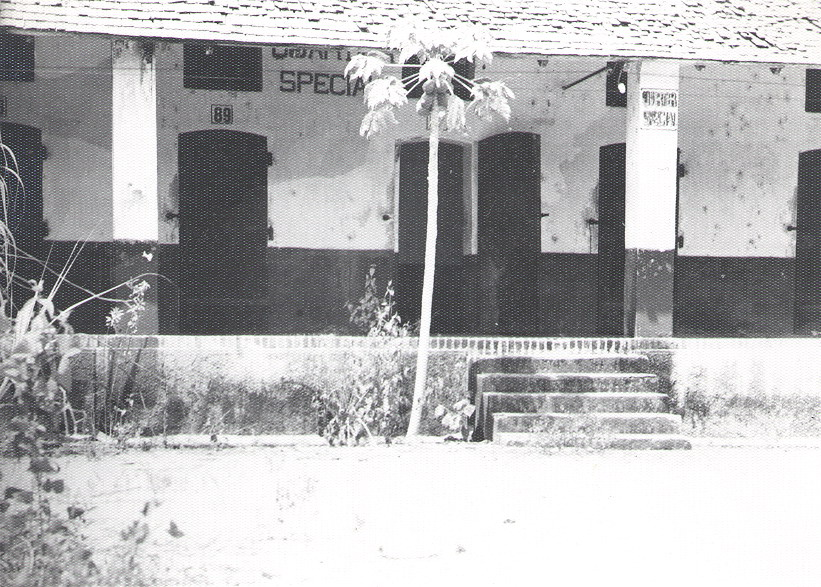
The prison as it appeared in 1954, not long before it was closed and abandoned

After the publication of Papillon in 1969, a bidding war started between Avco-Embassy Pictures, Continental Distributing, Metro-Goldwyn-Mayer and numerous French film companies for the film rights. Continental Distributing won the rights for $500,000, with the intent to hire Roman Polanski as director and Warren Beatty as lead actor, but the studio's funding fell through. It sold the rights to producer Robert Dorfmann, who initially intended to hire Terence Young as director and Charles Bronson as star, before turning to Franklin J. Schaffner and Steve McQueen. The film's first screenplay by William Goldman, which was more faithful to the book than the final film, was rewritten by Lorenzo Semple Jr. to expand the role of Louis Dega, in an attempt to convince Dustin Hoffman to join the cast and eliminate depictions of homosexuality among prisoners. After Hoffman's casting, Dalton Trumbo further rewrote the screenplay. Ratna Assan made her film debut in Papillon by portraying an indigenous woman named Zoraima, which resulted in extreme censorship when the film was screened in Indonesia.

Papillon was filmed at various locations in Spain and Jamaica, with the cave scenes filmed beneath what is now the Xtabi hotel on the cliffs of Negril. The town scenes near the beginning of the film were shot in Hondarribia, Spain. The St-Laurent-du-Maroni penal colony scenes were filmed in Falmouth, Jamaica, and the swamp scenes were shot near Ferris Cross. Interior scenes were shot in Montego Bay, while other scenes were filmed in Kingston, Ocho Rios and Savanna-la-Mar.

Most of the French prisoners on the island were portrayed by German-Jamaican extras. Steve McQueen's famous cliff-jumping scene near the film's climax took place from the cliffs in Maui, Hawaii. McQueen insisted on performing the cliff-jumping stunt himself. (Note: As with his motorcycle jump in The Great Escape, there is ambiguity about how much and which scene he performed; another is the slow-motion headlong fall, equally risky owing to a shallower river landing.) He later said it was "one of the most exhilarating experiences of my life".

McQueen was paid $2 million, along with the contractual stipulation that he receive first billing over Dustin Hoffman. In addition, author Henri Charrière acted as consultant on location, apprising the filmmakers of the things he encountered during his years of imprisonment.

The Prison of St-Laurent-du-Maroni, where Henri Charrière was held, and where most of the action takes place, was faithfully recreated using the original blueprints. Footage of the historic prison in French Guiana plays under the end credits, which is shown to be abandoned and covered in jungle growth.

== Soundtrack ==
The score to Papillon was composed and conducted by Jerry Goldsmith. It was recorded in Rome, Italy, at the Ortophonic Recording Studio by the "Unione Musicisti Roma Orchestra". The film marked Goldsmith's fourth (of seven) collaboration with director Franklin J. Schaffner, following his Academy Award-nominated scores to Planet of the Apes and Patton. Both the director and composer shared the belief that film music should be used economically. They wanted the music as commentary only, in sequences in which it can emphasize the psychological aspects of the film. In Papillon, the film is two and a half hours long, but has 40 minutes with music.

Goldsmith's compositions, characterized by a late romantic symphonic and impressionistic style suffused with a metered, exotic timbre (using instruments from Caribbean folk music), are distributed mainly in the second half of the film. They generally accompany scenes outside the prison, during the various escape attempts by the protagonist. He used a delicate melodic approach, dominated by a very catchy theme expressed as a waltz, which was often played using an accordion. The instrument was associated with the French origin of the protagonists. The theme song became famous with the popularity of the film, and it was released in many variations by different record companies.

The score was partially released on vinyl in 1973 and reissued over the years. In the 21st century, an edition was released on CD by Universal Records in France. For the first time, it was the complete version of music from the film (including about five minutes of previously unreleased tracks). The DVD of the English-language version of the film includes an option to listen to Goldsmith's music as an isolated audio track.

Goldsmith earned his sixth Academy Award nomination for Best Original Score for this soundtrack. It was one of the American Film Institute's 250 nominated soundtracks for the top 25 American film scores.

== Box office ==
The film was a commercial success and grossed $3,126,574 in its opening week. It earned theatrical rentals in the United States and Canada of $21.3 million.

== Critical reception ==
Roger Ebert's review at the film's original release was two stars out of four. He said that the main flaw was a failure to gain audience interest in McQueen's and Hoffman's characters: "You know something has gone wrong when you want the hero to escape simply so that the movie can be over."

Vincent Canby of The New York Times called the film "a big, brave, stouthearted, sometimes romantic, sometimes silly melodrama with the kind of visual sweep you don't often find in movies anymore."

Arthur D. Murphy of Variety wrote, "For 150 uninterrupted minutes, the mood is one of despair, brutality, and little hope."

Gene Siskel gave the film two-and-a-half stars out of four, and called it "just plain boring".

Kevin Thomas of the Los Angeles Times wrote, "Papillon is an eloquent tribute to the indomitability of the human spirit and a powerful indictment of those institutions dedicated only to breaking it. As such, it's lots easier to admire than to enjoy."

Gary Arnold of The Washington Post called it "a keen disappointment ... this lumbering vehicle directed by Franklin J. Schaffner leaves Steve McQueen and Dustin Hoffman stranded on the screen while opportunities for vivid filmmaking and sympathetic characterizations are bungled at every turn."

Richard Combs of The Monthly Film Bulletin wrote that "what is missing is any of the book's anger at the outrageous hypocrisy, injustice and inhumanity of the system; any of the passion which feeds Papillon's compulsion to escape."

In a retrospective review, Quentin Tarantino called it "a pretty iconic film for boys my age who saw it when it came out... The film is very involving. It contains maybe McQueen's finest serious acting moment on film, when he sticks his head out of the solitary confinement door and is not only unrecognizable but completely deranged. And the film contains one of the most powerful time cuts I've ever seen in a motion picture. The film's also not a little pretentious, self consciously arty, unrelentingly grim, extremely grueling and except for Dustin Hoffman keeping a bankroll and an extra pair of spectacles up his ass, completely devoid of any entertainment value."

On Rotten Tomatoes the film has a 74% rating based on 34 reviews. On Metacritic it has a score of 58% based on reviews from 10.

In 2025, The Hollywood Reporter listed Papillon as having the best stunts of 1973.

=== Accolades ===
In 1974, the film was nominated for an Oscar for Best Music, Original Dramatic Score (Jerry Goldsmith) and a Golden Globe Award for Best Motion Picture Actor, Drama (Steve McQueen).

== Remake ==
Another film based on the autobiographies of Charrière and the 1973 film, also called Papillon, was released in 2017, directed by Danish director Michael Noer. Charlie Hunnam played the lead role of Henri Charrière, and Rami Malek played Louis Dega. The film premiered at the Toronto International Film Festival in September 2017.

== See also ==
- List of American films of 1973
