= Salvation Islands =

Group of islands off the coast of French Guiana

Coordinates: 5°17′09″N 52°35′09″W

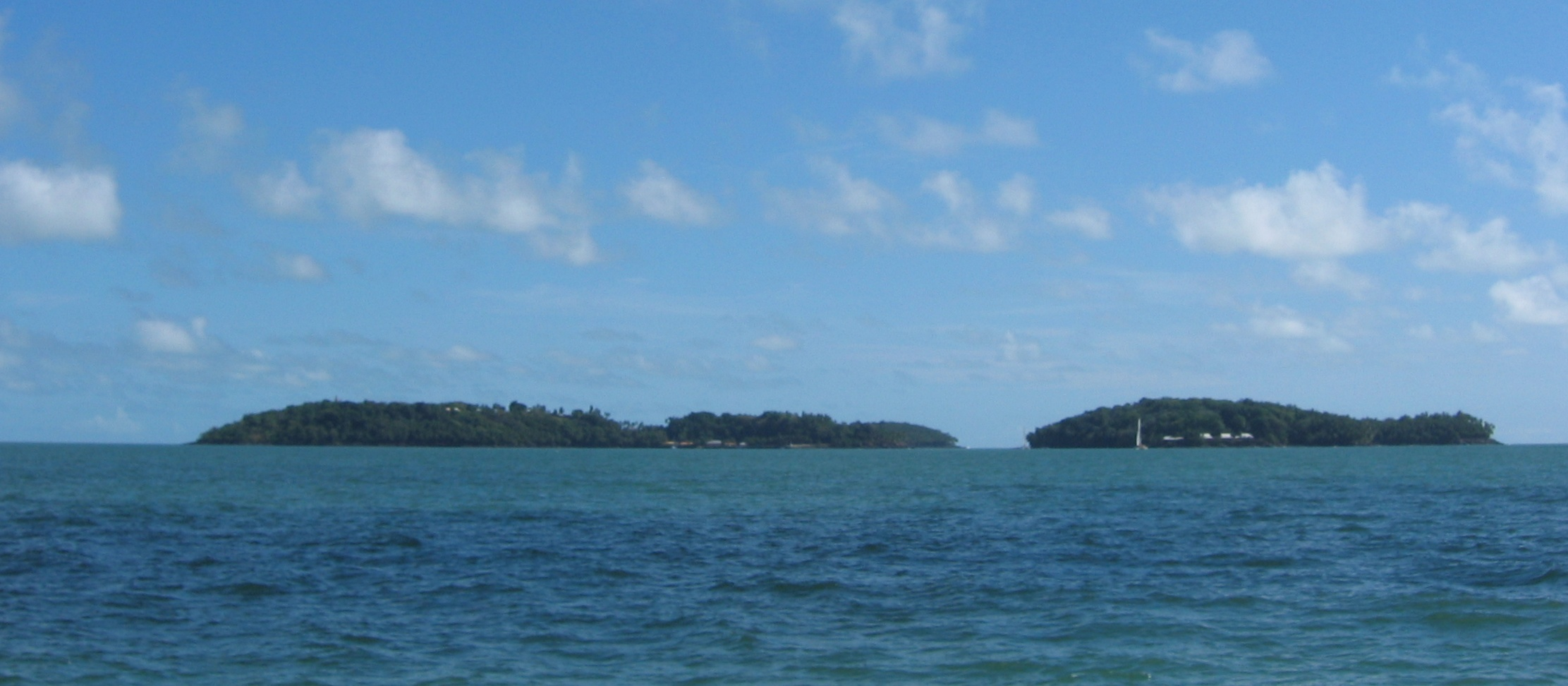
Salvation Islands

The Salvation Islands (French: Îles du Salut, so called because missionaries went there to escape plague on the mainland), sometimes mistakenly called the Safety Islands, are a group of small islands of volcanic origin about 11 kilometres (6 nautical miles) off the coast of French Guiana, 14 kilometres (7 1/2 nautical miles) north of Kourou, in the Atlantic Ocean. Although closer to Kourou, the islands are part of Cayenne commune (municipality), specifically Cayenne 1^{er} Canton Nord-Ouest.

== Geography ==
=== Islands ===
There are three islands, from north to south:

Island	Area (ha)	Height (m)
Devil's Island	14	40
Royale Island	28	66
Saint-Joseph Island	20	30
Total	62	

Devil's Island, the most famous due to Captain Alfred Dreyfus's political imprisonment there, is better known to French speakers as Île du Diable. Its area is 0.62 square kilometres (1/4 square mile). Devil's Island and Île Royale are separated by Passe des Grenadines, Île Royale and Saint-Joseph Island by Passe de Désirade.

=== Climate ===
The climate of Salvation Islands focuses on the characteristics of Royale Island. Royale Island (French: Île-Royale) has a tropical savanna climate (Köppen climate classification). The average annual temperature in Royale Island is 27.6 °C (81.7 °F). The average annual rainfall is 2,496.7 mm (98.30 in) with May as the wettest month. The temperatures are highest on average in October, at around 28.7 °C (83.7 °F), and lowest in January, at around 26.9 °C (80.4 °F). The highest temperature ever recorded in Royale Island was 34.8 °C (94.6 °F) on 10 November 2008; the coldest temperature ever recorded was 18.4 °C (65.1 °F) on 10 July 1979.

Climate data for Salvation Islands (Île-Royale, altitude 48m, 1991–2020 averages, extremes 1974−present)
Month	Jan	Feb	Mar	Apr	May	Jun	Jul	Aug	Sep	Oct	Nov	Dec	Year
Record high °C (°F)	31.9 (89.4)	33.2 (91.8)	33.5 (92.3)	34.4 (93.9)	33.9 (93.0)	32.7 (90.9)	32.7 (90.9)	34.6 (94.3)	34.6 (94.3)	34.7 (94.5)	34.8 (94.6)	33.4 (92.1)	34.8 (94.6)
Mean daily maximum °C (°F)	29.4 (84.9)	29.6 (85.3)	30.1 (86.2)	30.0 (86.0)	29.7 (85.5)	29.7 (85.5)	30.1 (86.2)	30.8 (87.4)	31.4 (88.5)	31.9 (89.4)	31.2 (88.2)	30.1 (86.2)	30.3 (86.5)
Daily mean °C (°F)	26.9 (80.4)	27.0 (80.6)	27.4 (81.3)	27.4 (81.3)	27.2 (81.0)	27.0 (80.6)	27.3 (81.1)	27.9 (82.2)	28.5 (83.3)	28.7 (83.7)	28.3 (82.9)	27.4 (81.3)	27.6 (81.7)
Mean daily minimum °C (°F)	24.4 (75.9)	24.4 (75.9)	24.8 (76.6)	24.9 (76.8)	24.7 (76.5)	24.3 (75.7)	24.5 (76.1)	25.1 (77.2)	25.5 (77.9)	25.6 (78.1)	25.4 (77.7)	24.8 (76.6)	24.9 (76.8)
Record low °C (°F)	20.0 (68.0)	20.8 (69.4)	21.2 (70.2)	21.4 (70.5)	20.3 (68.5)	20.1 (68.2)	18.4 (65.1)	20.9 (69.6)	21.1 (70.0)	20.5 (68.9)	19.8 (67.6)	20.6 (69.1)	18.4 (65.1)
Average precipitation mm (inches)	261.6 (10.30)	186.2 (7.33)	186.6 (7.35)	348.2 (13.71)	461.0 (18.15)	404.2 (15.91)	188.2 (7.41)	74.8 (2.94)	27.7 (1.09)	38.3 (1.51)	104.3 (4.11)	215.6 (8.49)	2,496.7 (98.30)
Average precipitation days (≥ 1.0 mm)	17.1	14.3	14.0	17.6	23.4	23.3	16.5	8.0	3.6	5.8	10.9	18.2	172.7
Mean monthly sunshine hours	—	125.9	151.4	143.7	136.2	—	203.1	—	246.9	248.6	202.8	—	—
Source 1: Météo-France
Source 2: Meteociel (sunshine 1981-2010)

== History ==
Between 1852 and 1953, the islands were part of a notorious penal colony for France's worst criminals. The penal colony stretched along the border with Suriname. Île Royale was the reception centre for the penal colony's general population; they were housed in moderate freedom because the island was so difficult to escape. Saint-Joseph Island was the Reclusion, where inmates were sent to be punished by solitary confinement in silence and darkness for escapes or offences committed in the penal colony. Devil's Island was for political prisoners. In the 19th century, the most famous such prisoner was Captain Alfred Dreyfus, held there from 1895 to 1899 after his conviction for treason.

This penal colony was controversial given its reputation for harshness and brutality. Prisoner-on-prisoner violence was common, tropical diseases killed many, and a small core of survivors returned to France and described how horrible it was, scaring other potential criminals. This system was gradually phased out and ended completely in 1953. Nowadays the islands are a popular tourist destination. They were featured in the autobiography Papillon, by Henri Charrière, who was imprisoned there for nine years. Joseph Conrad's short story An Anarchist (1906) is largely set in Salvation Islands.

As of 1979, the Salvation Islands are protected areas managed by Conservatoire du littoral.

The decree of September 4, 1891, established a disciplinary commission that judged the convicts and imposed punishments like the prison at night, the isolation cell, and the dungeon. Between 1892 and 1895, the disciplinary camp was built for difficult convicts. The buildings were organized around a courtyard where a guillotine was erected before each execution. Two washing places are at the end of the courtyard. This disciplinary camp accommodated the office and single guards housing, the black cells, the clear cells and two dormitories.

== Gallery ==
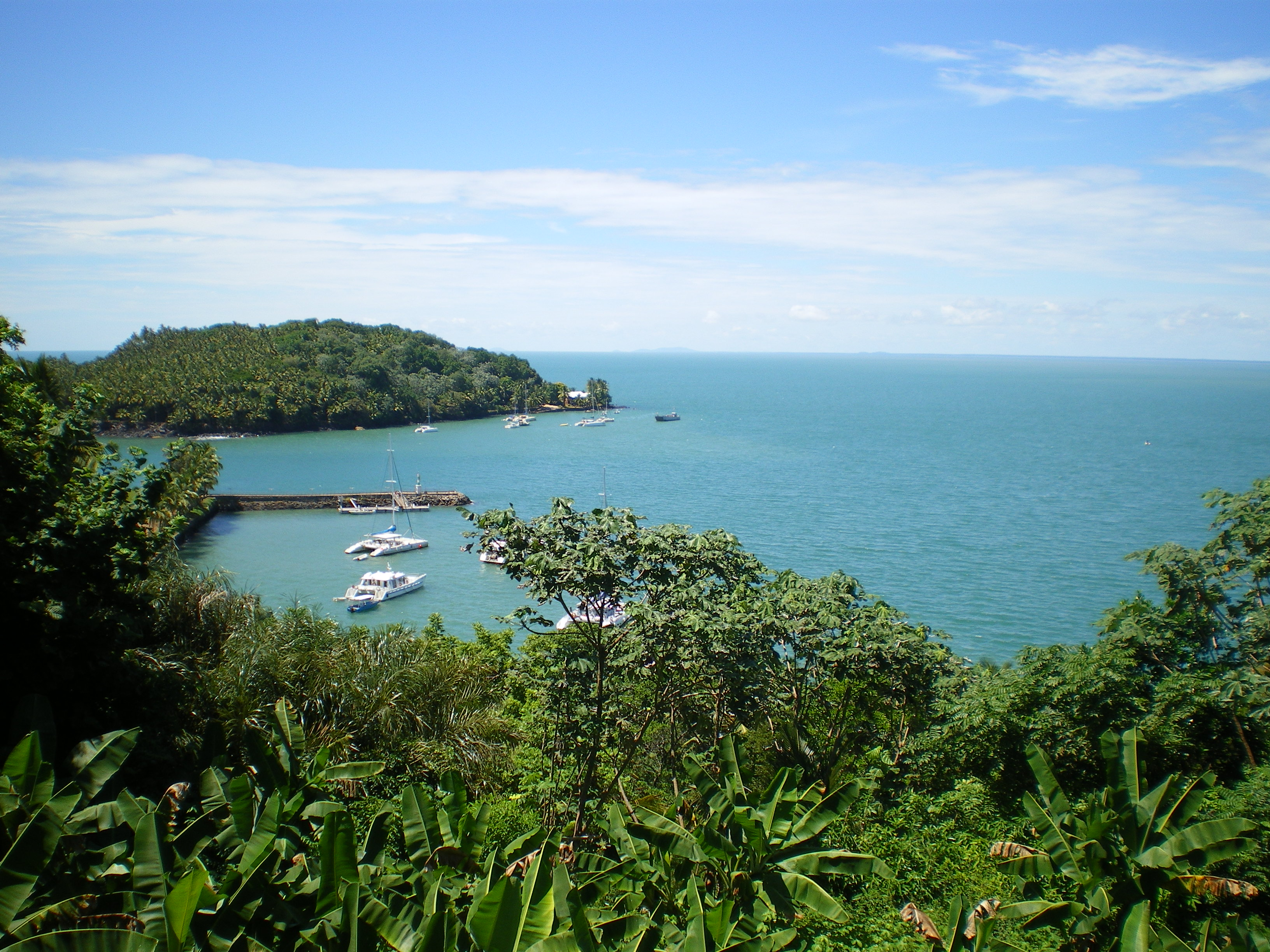
Royal Island.

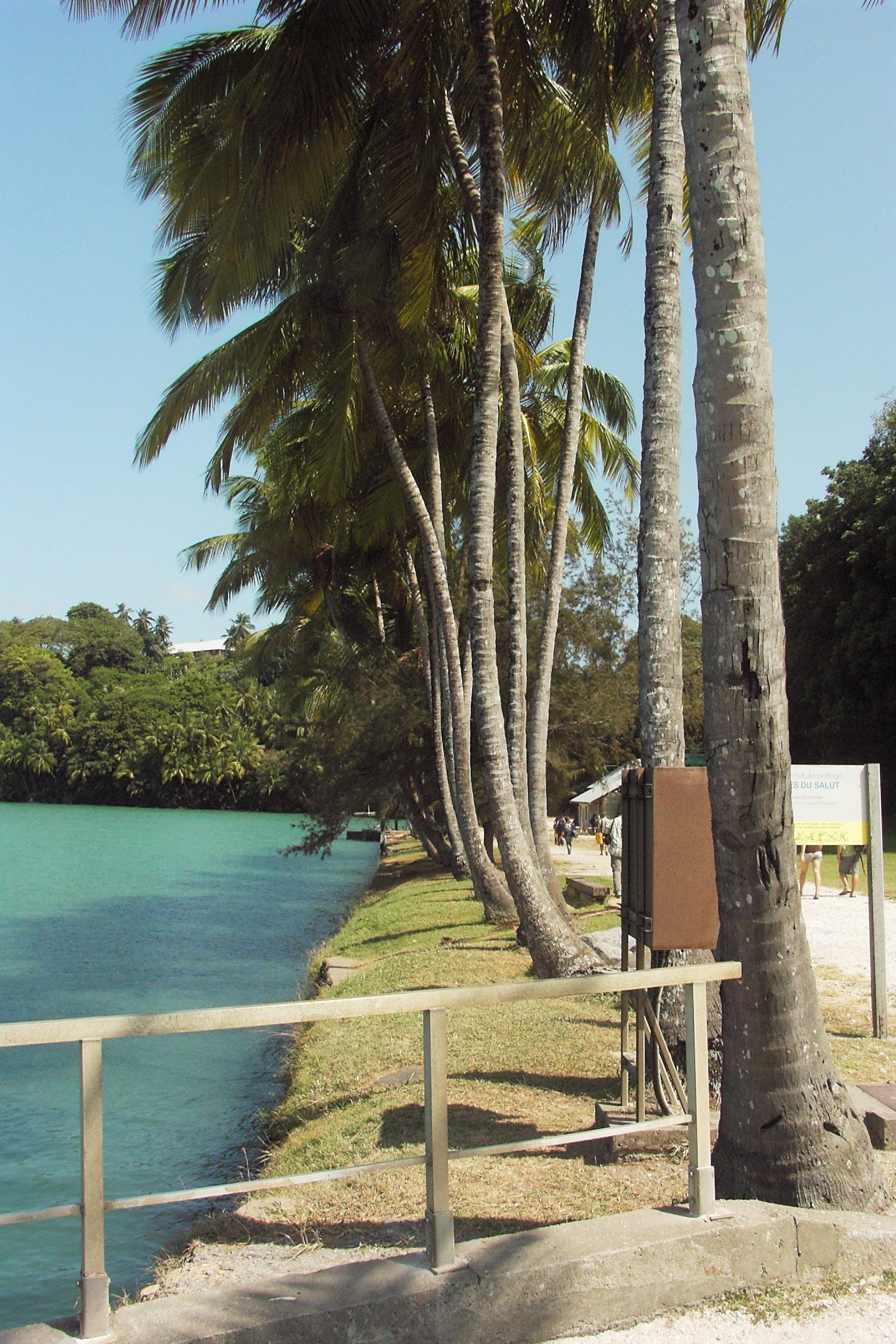
Arrival on Royal Island.

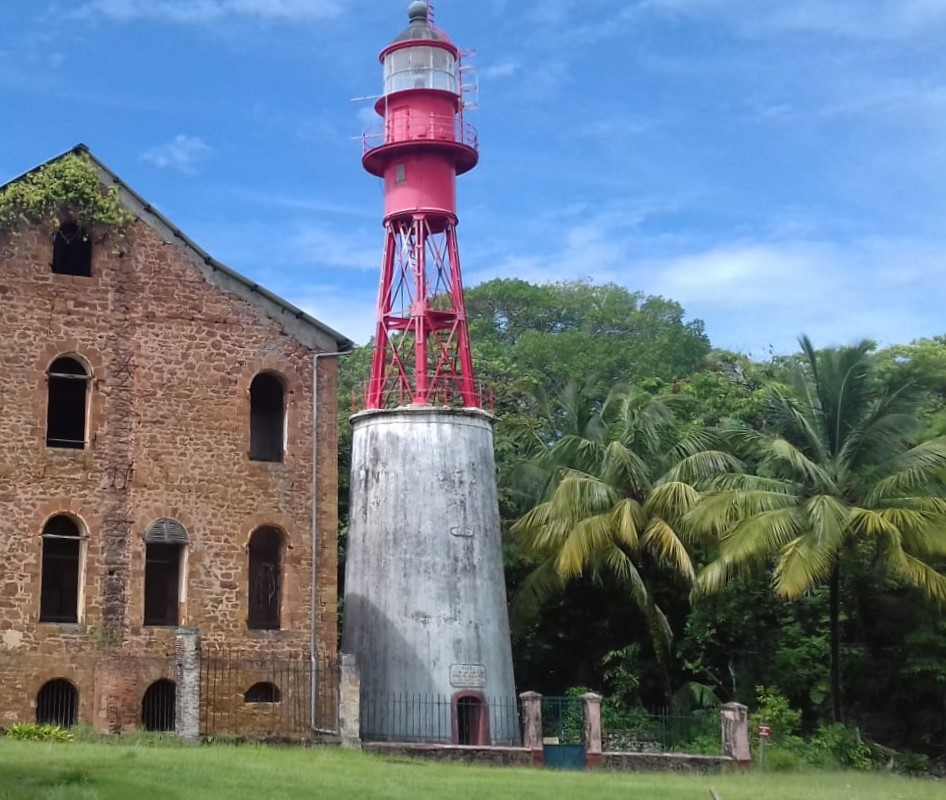
The Salvation Islands' Lighthouse.

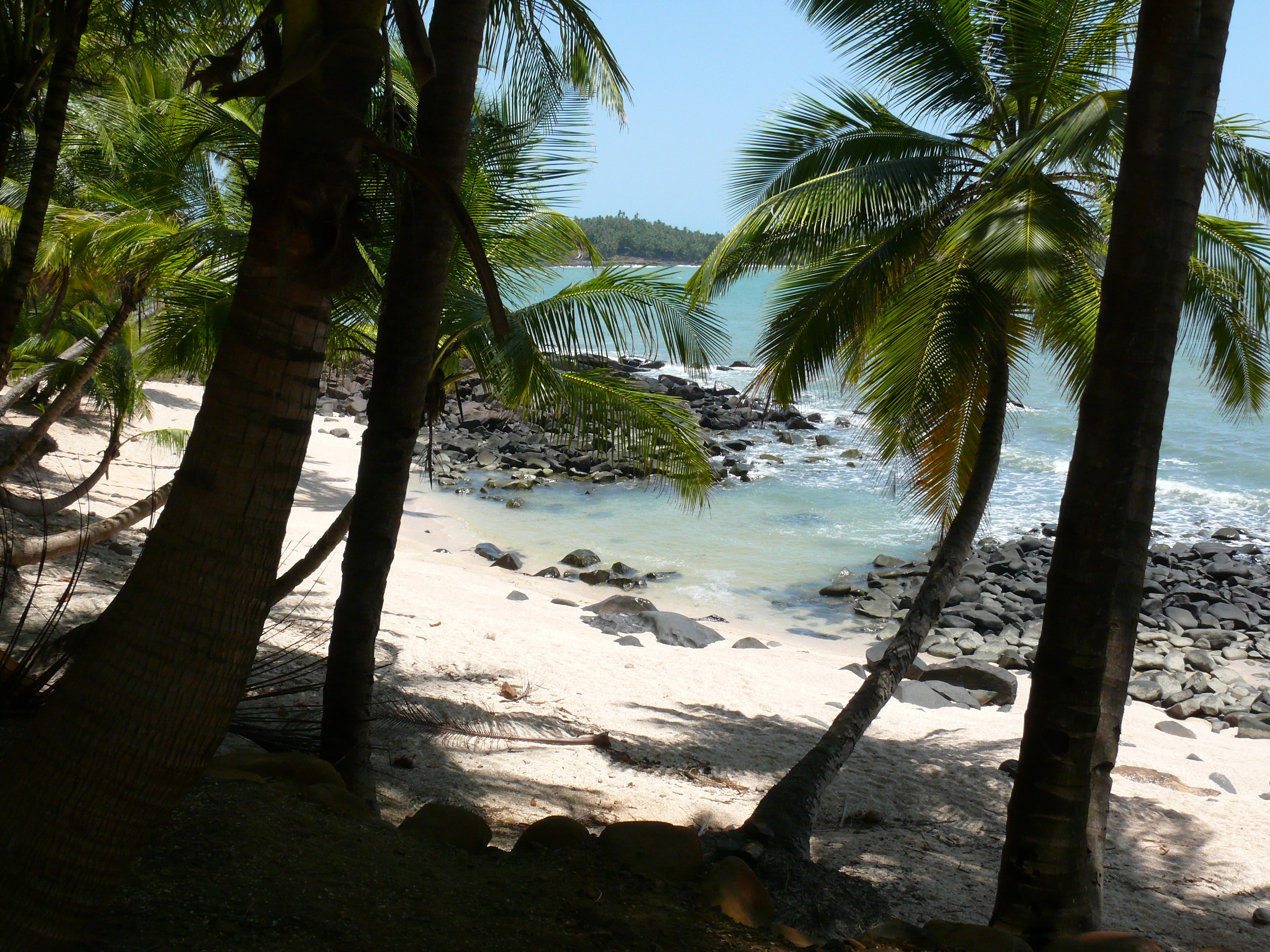
Saint Joseph Island's beach.

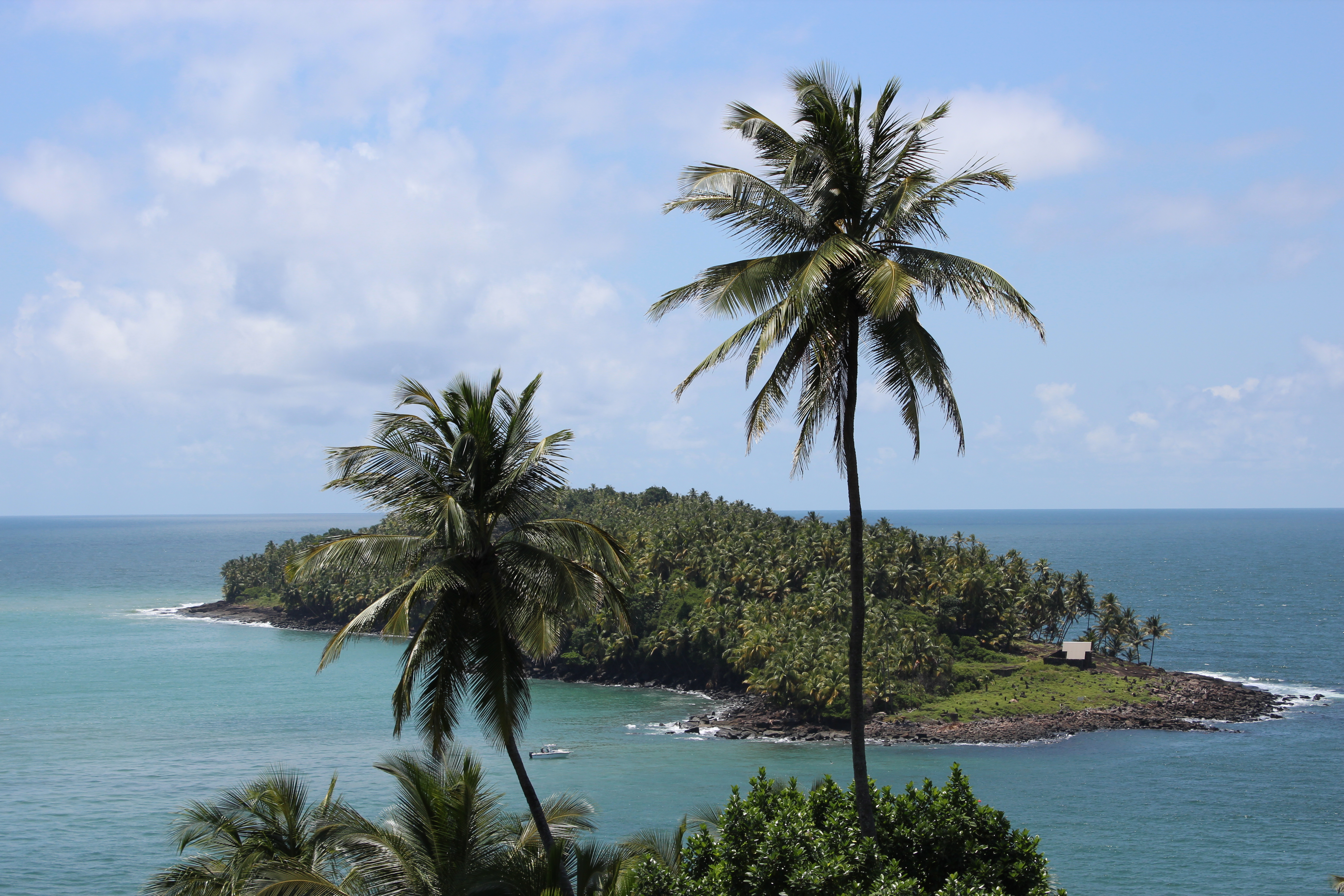
Devil's Island.

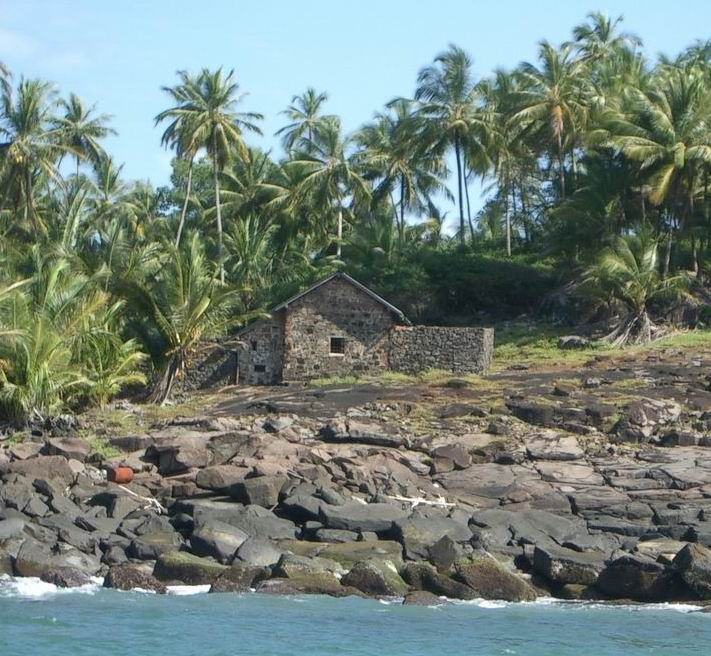
Alfred Dreyfus's House.
