= El Dorado, Venezuela =

El Dorado
- Location within Venezuela
- Coordinates: 6°43′0″N 61°37′0″W
- Country: Venezuela
- State: Bolívar State
- Municipality: Sifontes Municipality
- Founded: 2 March 1894

Government
  - Alcalde: Juan Rojas Medina (PSUV)
- Time zone: UTC−4 (VST)
- Climate: Am

El Dorado is a small town in eastern Venezuela. It is situated in Bolívar State, on the Cuyuni River. It is the second-largest town in Sifontes Municipality; the capital of the municipality is Tumeremo.

It is on the road to Brazil. El Dorado has a small airport, IATA: EOR, ICAO: SVED.

== History ==
El Dorado was founded in the 1890s. Gold mining was developing in the area, and there was a background of international tension caused by the Essequibo border dispute between Venezuela and Britain.

== Prison ==
The town has a prison, the Centro Penitenciario de Oriente El Dorado. The Venezuelan prison system is generally overcrowded, and El Dorado prison has been described in the British press as "notorious". In 2015 the Venezuelan press reported the completion of a stage in a project to expand the prison, providing new facilities for the rehabilitation of offenders.

=== Prisoners ===
- Henri Charrière. The prison is mentioned in the book Papillon. While the accuracy of the book has been questioned, it is not disputed that its author, Henri Charrière, was imprisoned in Venezuela in the 1940s, an epoch when the prisoners were assigned to mobile detention camps.

== See also ==
- List of cities and towns in Venezuela
