= Henri Charrière =

French writer (1906–1973)

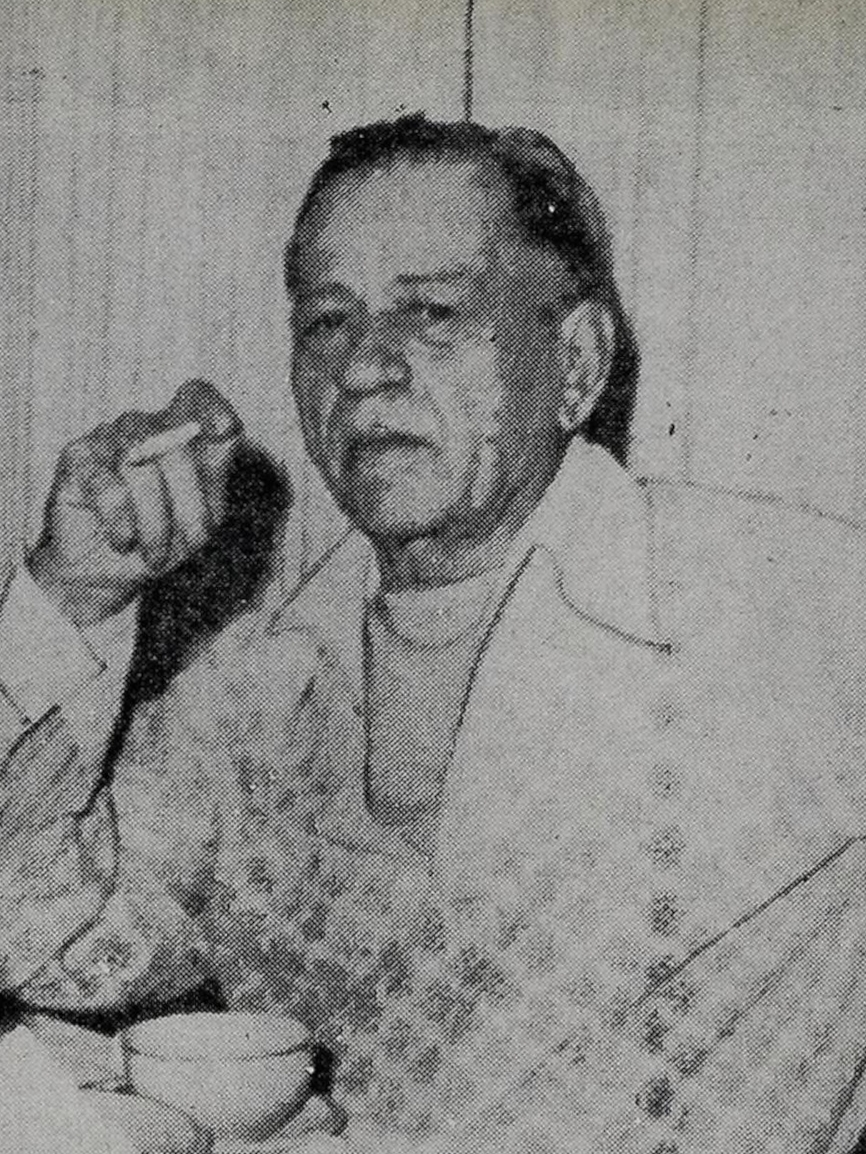
- Charrière in 1971
- Born: 16 November 1906; Saint-Étienne-de-Lugdarès, France
- Died: 29 July 1973 (aged 66); Madrid, Spain
- Other name: Papillon
- Occupation: Memoirist
- Known for: Papillon; Banco
- Spouse(s): Georgette Fourel (1929–30); Rita Ben-Simon (1945–73)

Henri Charrière (French pronunciation: [ɑ̃ʁi ʃaʁjɛʁ]; 16 November 1906 – 29 July 1973) was a French writer who was convicted of murder in 1931 by the French courts and pardoned in 1970. He wrote the 1969 novel Papillon, a memoir of his incarceration in and escape from a penal colony in French Guiana. While Charrière claimed that Papillon was largely true, modern researchers believe that much of the book's material came from other inmates, rather than Charrière himself. Charrière denied committing the murder, although he freely admitted to having committed various other petty crimes (notably when he was a procurer) prior to his incarceration.

== Biography ==
=== Early life ===
Charrière was born on 16 November 1906 at Saint-Étienne-de-Lugdarès, Ardèche, France. He had two older sisters. His mother died when he was ten. In 1923 at seventeen, he enlisted in the French Navy and served for two years. After that, he became a member of the Paris underworld. He later married and had a daughter.

=== Imprisonment ===
==== According to Papillon ====
The version of his life presented in his semi-biographical novel, Papillon, claimed that Charrière was convicted on 26 October 1931 of the murder of a pimp named Roland Le Petit, a charge that he strongly denied. He was sentenced to life in prison and ten years of hard labour. He had married Georgette Fourel at the town hall of the 1st arrondissement of Paris, on 22 December 1929. (They divorced on 8 July 1930 by decision of the Paris High Court.) After a brief imprisonment at the transit prison of Beaulieu in Caen, France, he was transported in 1933 to the prison of St-Laurent-du-Maroni on the Maroni River, in the penal settlement of mainland French Guiana.

According to the book, he made his first escape on 28 November 1933 and was joined by fellow prisoners André Maturette and Joanes Clousiot, who would accompany him throughout much of his time on the run. 37 days later, the trio were captured by Colombian police near the village of Riohacha, northern Caribbean Region of Colombia, and were imprisoned. Charrière subsequently escaped during a rainy night and fled to the La Guajira Peninsula, where he was adopted by an indigenous tribe. He spent several months living with the natives, but felt that he had to move on, which was a decision he would ultimately regret. After leaving, he was quickly recaptured and sent back to French Guiana to be put into solitary confinement for the next two years.

After his release from solitary confinement, he spent another seven years in prison. During this period he attempted to escape several more times, resulting in increasingly brutal responses from his captors. He stated that he was then confined to Devil's Island, a labour camp (Devil's Island was not a labour camp so much as an internment camp) that, at the time, was notorious for being inescapable. French authorities later released penal colony records that contradicted this amongst other details, Charrière had never been imprisoned on Devil's Island. However, he finally achieved his permanent liberation in 1941 by using a bag of coconuts as a makeshift raft and, riding the tide out from the island, he escaped with another convict. However, his companion drowned in quicksand when they reached the shore of French Guiana.

After meeting up with some escaped Chinese prisoners on the mainland, they bought a boat and sailed to Georgetown, British Guiana. After almost a year, a bored Charrière then joined another group of escaped convicts in a new boat with the intent of reaching British Honduras. However, after sailing into a cyclone, they only managed to reach Venezuela. They were all arrested and sent to a brutal penal settlement in El Dorado, Bolivar State. After a year of imprisonment, Charrière was released with identity papers on 3 July 1944. Five years later he was given Venezuelan citizenship.

==== According to French records ====
French records of his life from 1933 to 1944 present a different account: He left the citadel of Saint-Martin-de-Ré on 29 September 1933 aboard the Martinière and landed on 14 October with the status of "transported" to Saint-Laurent-du-Maroni. There was little time left in the transportation camp, as he was assigned as a nursing assistant to the André-Bouron Colonial Hospital, where he saw many inmates returning from the run who told him their escape stories, from which he drew inspiration. This place spared him from the work of logging sites or agricultural concessions that annihilated convicts in a few months. He escaped for the first time on 5 September 1934, but failed in Colombia, a country that returned escaped convicts to France. Judged by the Special Maritime Court, he spent two years in the cells of the St. Joseph's Island Seclusion. Several times transferred, he ended up as chief nurse in an Indochinese camp on the Guyanese mainland, the Cascades forest camp, from which he escaped on the night of 18–19 March 1944, along with four companions.

=== Later life ===
After Charrière had served a year's probationary freedom, he was given his total liberty in 1945. He remained in Venezuela and became a naturalized citizen. He married a Venezuelan woman identified as Rita Bensimon. He opened restaurants in Caracas and Maracaibo. He was subsequently treated as a minor celebrity, even being invited frequently to appear on local television programmes. He finally returned to France, visiting Paris in conjunction with the publication of his memoir Papillon (1969). The book sold over 1.5 million copies in France, prompting a French minister to attribute "the moral decline of France" to miniskirts and Papillon. Papillon was first published in the United Kingdom in 1970, in a translation by the novelist Patrick O'Brian. Charrière played the part of a jewel thief in a 1970 film called Popsy Pop directed by the French director Jean Vautrin, and released internationally in English as The Butterfly Affair. He also wrote a sequel to Papillon entitled Banco, in which he describes his life after being released from prison.

In 1970, the French justice system issued a pardon to Charrière for his 1931 murder conviction.

=== Death ===
On 29 July 1973, Charrière died of throat cancer in Madrid, Spain.

== Works ==
He wrote two autobiographical novels in the Papillon series: Papillon (1969) and Banco (1973).

Charrière's best-selling book Papillon, which he said was "75 percent true", details his alleged numerous escapes, attempted escapes, adventures, and recaptures, from his imprisonment in 1932 to his final escape to Venezuela. The book's title is Charrière's nickname, derived from a butterfly tattoo on his chest (papillon being French for butterfly). Modern researchers, however, believe that Charrière got much of his story material from other inmates, and so see the work as more of a work of fiction than a true autobiography.

In his book Les quatre vérités de Papillon (lit. The Four Truths of Papillon), Georges Ménager, a former Paris Match reporter, claims that Charrière was in fact a police informer and a pimp before his incarceration, and lived off the proceeds of his girlfriend's prostitution, and that he later tried to blame her for the murder of Roland Legrande. Charrière claims to have been incarcerated in Saint Laurent and may have escaped from there, but according to French officials, he never served any time on Devil's Island.

The book and movie both present Devil's Island as having rocky cliffs, when, in fact, although the entire island is rocky, it gently slopes into the surrounding sea. A French justice ministry report said Charrière's book included episodes that were imagined or involved others and "should be divided by at least 10 to get near the truth".

In 2005, a 104-year-old man in Paris, Charles Brunier, claimed to be the real Papillon. He also had a butterfly tattoo, on his left arm.

Critics tend to agree that Charrière's depictions included events that happened to others and that Brunier was at the prison at the same time. Critics claim that the heroic rescue of a guard's young daughter from sharks, which Charrière describes graphically in his book, was in fact carried out by another convict named Alfred Steffen who lost both legs and subsequently died. When some critics questioned the veracity of his story and said he erred on some of the dates, Charrière replied: "I didn't have a typewriter with me." French journalist Gerard de Villiers, author of Papillon Épinglé ("Butterfly Pinned"), maintains: "Only about 10 percent of Charrière's book represents the truth."

== Adaptations ==
- Papillon (1973), film directed by Franklin J. Schaffner, based on novel Papillon. Charrière served as a location consultant and was portrayed by Steve McQueen, who received a Golden Globe nomination for his performance.
- Papillon (2017), film directed by Michael Noer, based on novels Papillon and Banco. Charrière was portrayed by Charlie Hunnam.
