= Devil's Island =

Prison of Cayenne in French Guiana

Bagne de Cayenne (Devil's Island)
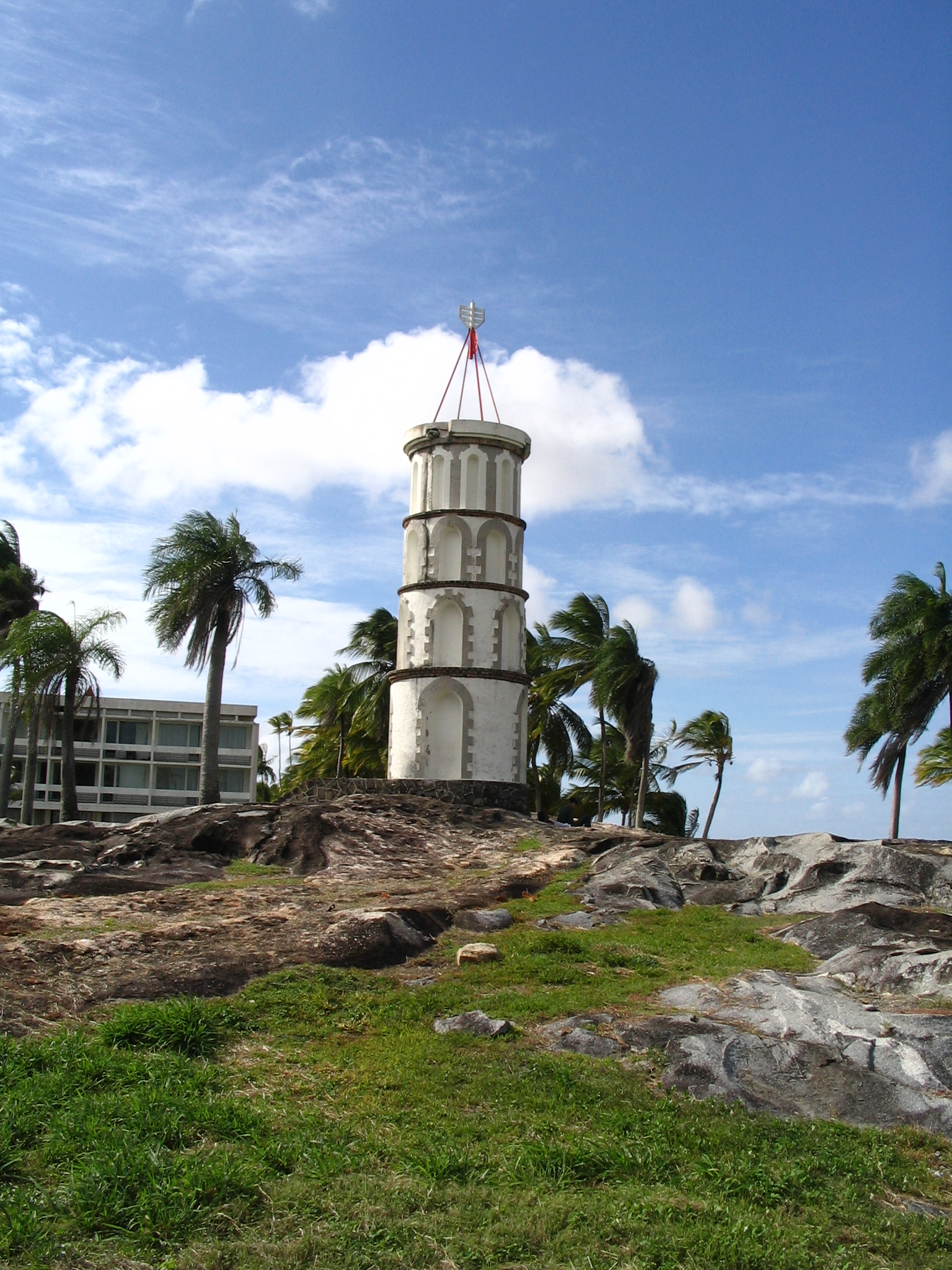
- The Dreyfus Tower on the Pointe des Roches, Kourou
- Interactive map of Bagne de Cayenne (Devil's Island)
- Location: French Guiana; 5°17′32″N 52°35′03″W
- Status: Closed (tourist attraction)
- Security class: Maximum
- Opened: 1852; 174 years ago
- Closed: 1953; 73 years ago

The penal colony of Cayenne (French: Bagne de Cayenne), commonly known as Devil's Island (Île du Diable), was a French penal colony that operated for 100 years, from 1852 to 1952, and officially closed in 1953, in the Salvation Islands of French Guiana.

Opened in 1852, the Devil's Island system received convicts from the Prison of St-Laurent-du-Maroni, who had been deported from all parts of the Second French Empire. It was notorious both for the staff's harsh treatment of prisoners and the tropical climate and diseases that contributed to high mortality, with a death rate of 75 percent at its worst.

Devil's Island was also notorious for being used for the exile of French political prisoners, with the most famous being Captain Alfred Dreyfus, who had been wrongly accused of spying for Imperial Germany during the late 19th- and early 20th-century.

== Organization ==
The prison system encompassed several locations, both on the mainland and in the off-shore Salvation Islands. Île Royale was the reception centre for the general population of the penal colony; they were housed in moderate freedom due to the difficulty of escape from the island. Saint-Joseph Island was the Reclusion, where inmates were sent to be punished by solitary confinement in silence and darkness, for attempted escapes or offences committed in the penal colony. Devil's Island was for political prisoners. In the 19th century, the most famous such prisoner was Captain Alfred Dreyfus.

In addition to the prisons on each of the three islands in the Salvation Islands group, the French constructed three related prison facilities on the South American mainland: just across the straits at Kourou, 50 kilometres (30 mi) east in Cayenne (which later became the capital of French Guiana), and St. Laurent, 160 km (100 mi) to the west.

== History ==
=== Early penal system ===
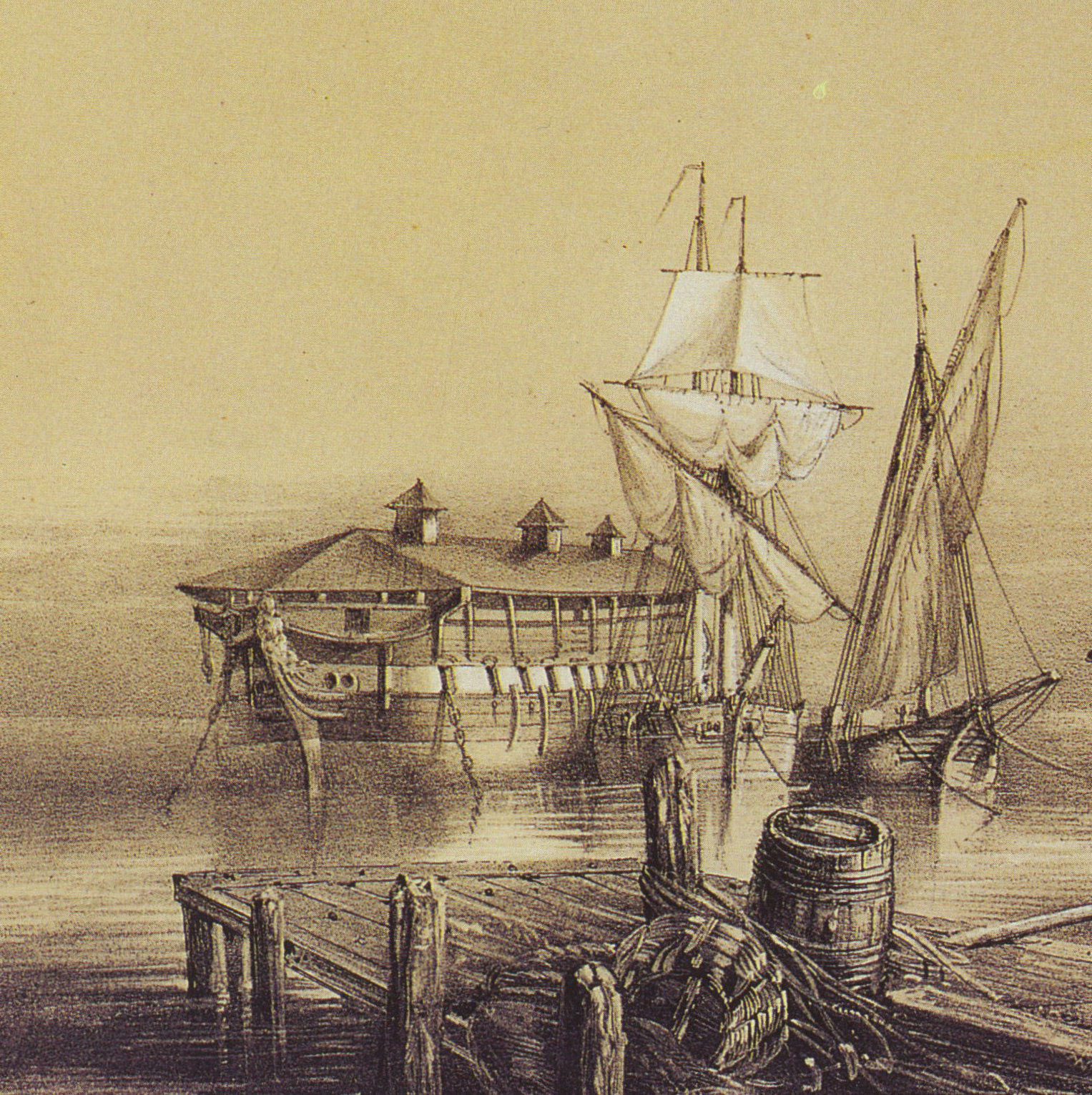
A French prison hulk in Toulon harbour, 1850

During the 16th and 17th centuries, prisoners convicted of felonies in the Kingdom of France were sentenced to serve as galley slaves in the French Navy's Levant Fleet. Given their harsh conditions, this was virtually a death sentence. Following the decommissioning of all galleys of the Levant Fleet in 1666, the French government kept the majority of prisoners chained in pairs onboard galley hulks permanently moored in various harbours until they rotted and sank. Once a hulk sank, its prisoners, who relied on charity or their families for food, bedding and clothing, were transferred to live on adjacent pontoons. They were required to work 12 hours a day in the docks, earning up to 10–15 centimes, which they could spend on food and drink. Other prisoners were housed in prisons onshore, but conditions were reportedly so bad that many prisoners would beg to be transferred to the hulks.

By the early 19th century, France's urban population had increased from under six million to over 16 million, and crime kept pace. In 1832, legislation was passed mandating the state's provision of basic necessities to prisoners. Prison reform changed the previous reliance on corporal punishment through hard labor, to imprisonment with a goal of punishment and deterrence. Imprisonment was considered a way to remove offenders from society. Recidivism of up to 75% had become a major problem; released and unemployed prisoners entered cities to seek a way to live.

In the 1840s, the state set up internal agricultural penal colonies as a place to receive prisoners, thereby removing them from urban environments and giving them work. Prisoners were commonly sentenced under doublage by which, on completion of their sentence, they were required to work as employees at the penal colony for an additional period equal to their original sentence.

The French Navy, which had been given the task of managing the prison hulks, complained strongly about the cost of guarding the hulks and the disruption they caused to the work of the shipyards. Following his coup in 1851, Emperor Napoleon III ordered that the hulks be permanently closed and that civil law convicts be transferred overseas to colonies. Debate over where the convicts would be sent was prolonged. Algeria was ruled out by the Navy as it was controlled by the French Army; Haiti, Cuba, the Dominican Republic, and Texas in the United States were considered, but the government eventually chose its own colony of French Guiana.

Since 1604, France had repeatedly failed to colonize French Guiana. The last attempt at colonization was in 1763. Some 75% of the 12,000 colonists who had been sent there died in their first year, often from tropical diseases. By the 1850s, the declining number of survivors were on the brink of extinction. In 1852, Napoleon called for volunteer prisoners from the hulks to transfer to the new Bagne de Cayenne (Cayenne penal colony) at French Guiana; 3,000 convicts applied. Two categories of prisoners were eligible for transportation: transportés, those civil-law prisoners sentenced under doublage, and déportés, prisoners convicted of political crimes, such as espionage or conspiracy. France also continued to use the hulks, housing an average of 5,400 prisoners at a time, until they were finally closed around the end of the 19th century. The agricultural penal colonies continued to be used for juveniles until the last was closed in 1939.

=== Use as penal colony ===
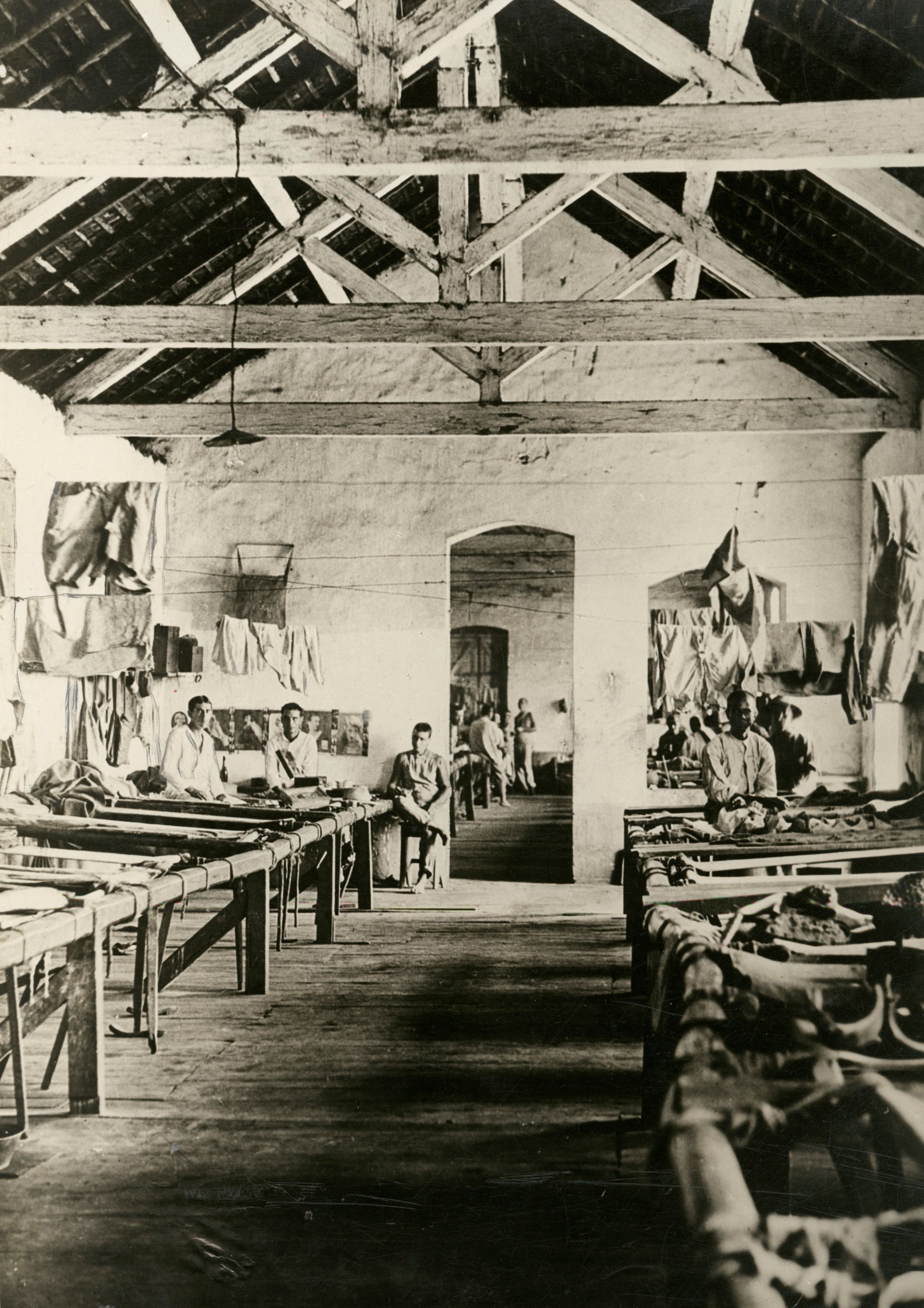
Sleeping quarters/dormitory in the penal colony

Devil's Island and associated prisons eventually became one of the most infamous prison systems in history. While the prison system was in use (1852–1952), inmates included political prisoners (such as 239 republicans who opposed Napoleon III's coup d'état in 1851) and the most hardened of thieves and murderers. The islands housed those convicted by juries rather than magistrates.

The vast majority of the more than 80,000 prisoners sent to the Devil's Island prison system never returned to France. Many died due to disease and harsh conditions. Sanitary systems were limited, and the region was mosquito-infested, with the insects transmitting endemic tropical diseases. The only exit from the island prisons was by water, and few convicts escaped.

The main part of the penal colony was a labour camp that stretched along the border with Dutch Guiana (present-day Suriname). This penal colony developed a reputation for harshness and brutality, and generated periodic calls for reform. Inter-prisoner violence was common; tropical diseases were rife. Only a small minority of broken survivors returned to France to tell how horrible it was; they sometimes scared other potential criminals to go straight. This system was gradually phased out and closed completely in 1953.

Convicts who were lucky enough to have family or friends willing to send them money had to have it sent to them in care of a prison guard. The standard practice was for the guard to keep for himself a quarter of the amount sent and give the rest to the prisoner.

On 30 May 1854, France passed a new law of forced residency. It required convicts to stay in French Guiana after completion of sentence for a time equal to their forced labour time. If the original sentence exceeded eight years, they were forced to stay as residents for the remainder of their lives and were given land on which to settle. In time, a variety of penal regimes emerged, as convicts were divided into categories according to the severity of their crimes and the terms of their imprisonment or "forced residence" regime.

An 1885 law provided for repeat offenders for minor crimes to be sent to the French Guiana prison system, previously reserved for serious offenders and political prisoners. A limited number of convicted women were also sent to French Guiana, with the intent that they marry freed male inmates to aid in settlement and development of the colony. As the results were poor, the government discontinued the practice in 1907. On Devil's Island itself, the small prison facility did not usually house more than 12 persons.

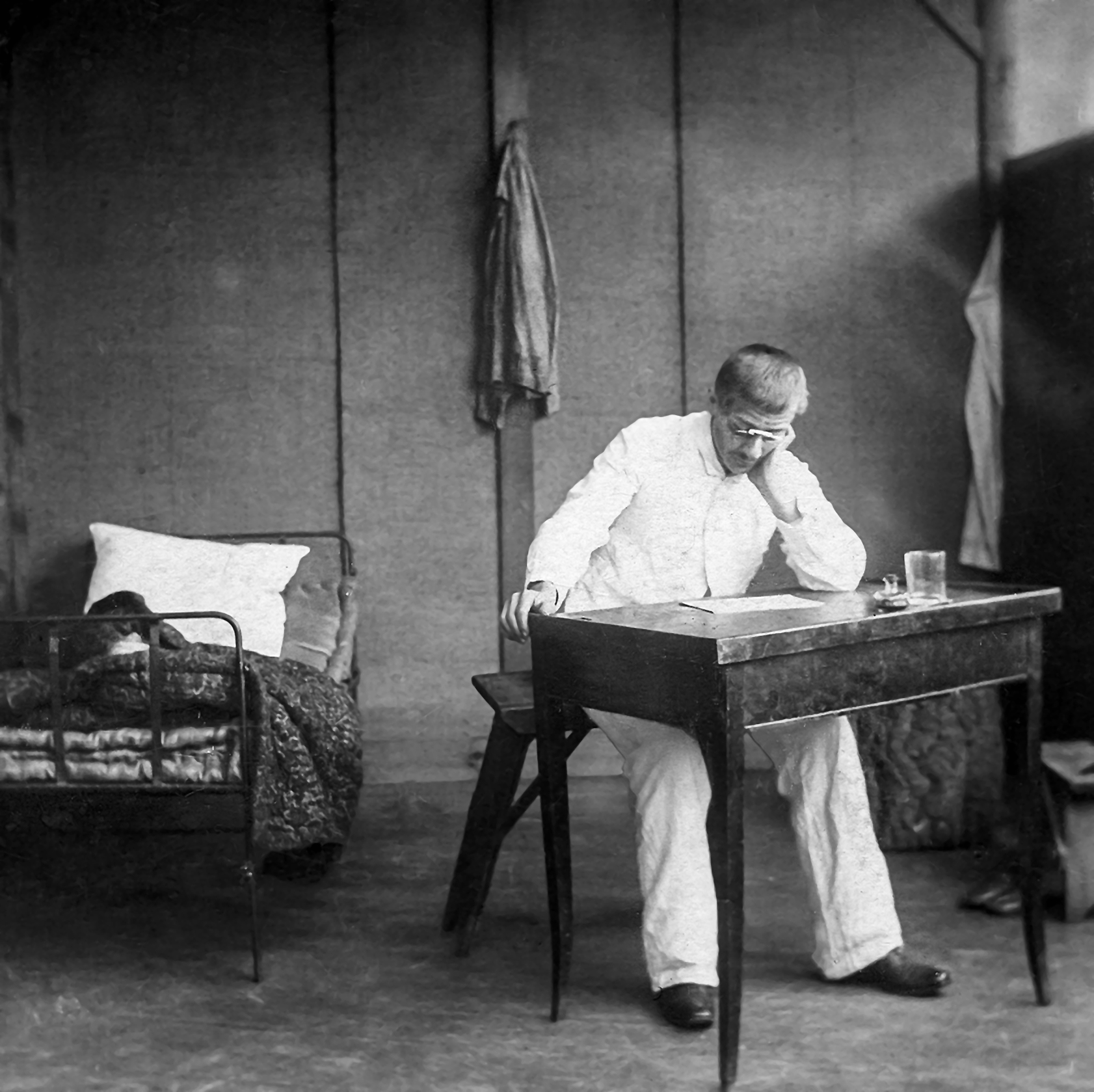
Alfred Dreyfus in his room on Devil's Island, 1898. Stereoscopy sold by F. Hamel, Altona-Hamburg...; collection Fritz Lachmund

The horrors of the penal settlement were publicised during the Dreyfus affair, as the French army captain Alfred Dreyfus was unjustly convicted of treason and sent to Devil's Island on 5 January 1895. In 1938, the penal system was strongly criticized in René Belbenoît's book Dry Guillotine.

Shortly after the release of Belbenoît's book, which aroused public outrage about the conditions, the French government announced plans to close the bagne de Cayenne. The outbreak of World War II delayed this operation but, from 1946 until 1953, one by one the prisons were closed. The Devil's Island facility was the last to be closed.

The cable car system that provided access to Devil's Island from Royale Island deteriorated and Devil's Island is now closed to public access. It can be viewed from off shore by use of charter boats. The two larger islands in the Salut island group are open to the public, with some of the old prison buildings restored as museums. They have become tourist destinations.

=== Fifteen women to camp ===
Around the middle of the 19th century, an experiment was carried out in which 15 female inmates were brought to Devil's Island with the intention to force them to marry and start families with male prisoners. The women were guarded by nuns. No families were born. Disputes arose among the men, and eventually a syphilis epidemic raged on the island.

=== Alleged and successful escapes ===
==== Charles DeRudio ====
After an attempt on 14 January 1858 to assassinate Emperor Napoleon III, Charles DeRudio was sentenced to life imprisonment on Devil's Island. He escaped with twelve others, making their way to British Guiana. In later life, he joined the American Army and survived the Battle of the Little Bighorn.

==== Clément Duval ====
Clément Duval, an anarchist, was sent to Devil's Island in 1886. Originally sentenced to death, he later received a commuted sentence of hard labour for life. He escaped in April 1901 and fled to New York City, where he remained for the rest of his life. He eventually wrote a book about his imprisonment called Revolte.

==== François Frean, Paul Renuci, Raymond Vaude, and Giovanni Batistoti ====
Four escapees from Devil's Island—François Frean, 37, Paul Renuci, 32, Raymond Vaude, 35, all French, and Giovanni Batistoti, 35—arrived in St. Thomas, U.S. Virgin Islands, on 18 October 1936. Their native boat was nearly wrecked on the reef and the convicts were initially entertained as guests and treated for injuries at the Municipal Hospital.

==== Henri Charrière and Sylvain ====
Henri Charrière's bestselling book Papillon (1969) describes his successful escape from Devil's Island, with a companion, Sylvain. They used two sacks filled with coconuts to act as rafts. According to Charrière, the two men leaped into heavy seas from a cliff and drifted to the mainland over a period of three days. Sylvain died in quicksand a short distance from the shore. From there, Charrière was to meet a man by the name of Cuic-Cuic who would help him continue and complete his escape to freedom; instead Charrière was caught again and served for a time in the Bagne at El Dorado, Venezuela. Once finally freed, he remained in Venezuela.

Charrière's account aroused considerable controversy. French authorities disputed it and released penal colony records that contradicted his account. Charrière had never been imprisoned on Devil's Island. He had escaped from a mainland prison. French journalists or prison authorities disputed other elements of his book and said that he had invented many incidents or appropriated experiences of other prisoners. Critics said he should have admitted his book was fiction.

==== Félix Milani ====
Félix Milani travelled on the same ship over as Henri Charrière and wrote a book about his experiences titled The Convict.

==== René Belbenoît ====
René Belbenoît is perhaps the most renowned escapee of the penal colony, who wrote about his experiences in two well-received memoirs: Hell on Trial (1940) and The Dry Guillotine: Fifteen Years Among the Living Dead (1938). After leaving the colony with temporary permission in 1930, he eventually made his way to the Panama Canal where he worked for nearly a year. In late 1930, he decided to return to France to argue for his freedom. However, it was a crime for a Devil's Island convict to return to France. He was sent back to French Guiana in 1931 to the prison colony. This time he was sent to Île Royale rather than Devil's Island. He was put into solitary confinement for almost one year. In 1934, he was again released, but as a libéré, or free prisoner; he was, as before in 1930, not allowed to return to France. He eventually made his way to the United States. He gained U.S. citizenship in 1956 and died in California in 1959, age 59.

==== Francis Lagrange ====
Francis Lagrange was a painter and forger who wrote a book about his experiences on Devil's Island.

==== Bernard Carnot ====
According to the second memoir of American sailor and writer William Willis (Damned and Damned Again), a few days after New Years in 1938, he rented a room in New York City from a French immigrant named Madame Carnot. Her son, Bernard Carnot, had been sent to Devil's Island in 1922 for a murder that he did not commit, and the Carnot family had since moved to the United States. Out of compassion and a sense of adventure, Willis set out to the penal colony to effect Bernard Carnot's escape, which he eventually accomplished. The subtitle of the book indicates that it documents the 'true story of the last escape from Devil's Island'.

Carnot was smuggled to Brazil aboard a supply ship, and was never reunited with his family, although they learned via Willis that he had gained his freedom. On the outbreak of WW2 he returned to Europe and joined the French forces. He is believed to have been killed in action shortly before the liberation of Strasbourg.

== Aftermath ==
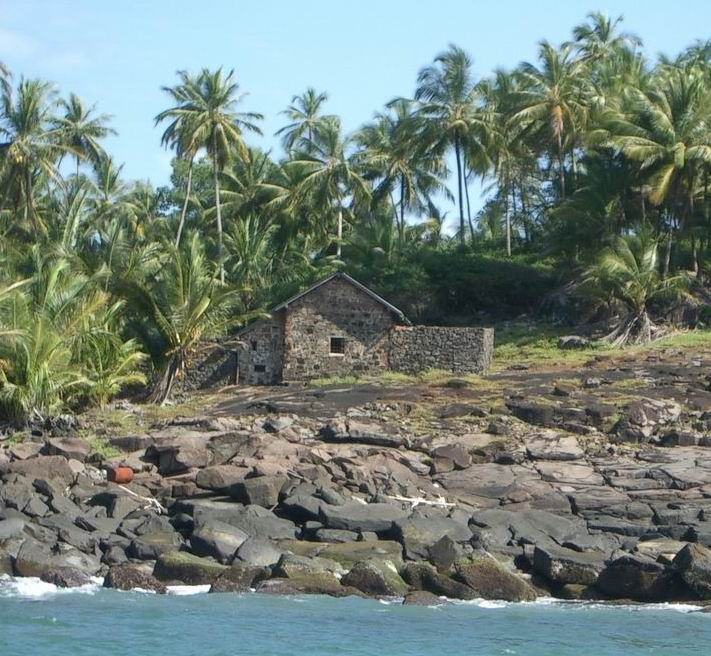
The hut in which Dreyfus lived

In 1938, the French government stopped sending prisoners to Devil's Island. In 1953, the prison system was finally closed entirely. Most of the prisoners at the time were repatriated to metropolitan France by the Salvation Army. Some chose to stay and resettle in French Guiana.

In 1965, the French government transferred responsibility for most of the islands to its newly-founded Guiana Space Centre under the authority of the National Centre for Space Studies. The islands are under the trajectory of the space rockets launched eastward from the CNES facility toward the sea (to geostationary orbit). They must be evacuated during each launch. The islands host a variety of measurement apparatus for space launches and some buildings classified as historical monuments have been restored.

Since the late 20th century, the islands have become tourist destinations with areas of the former prisons open for tours. With the addition of tourism facilities, the islands receive more than 50,000 tourists each year.

== In popular culture ==
- In the 1925 American film The Phantom of the Opera, starring Lon Chaney, the Phantom is said to have escaped Devil's Island.
- Devil's Island is featured in the plot of The Dain Curse (1928), a novel by Dashiell Hammett, an American mystery writer.
- Ronald Colman plays a Devil's Island prisoner in the 1929 film Condemned.
- Danish writer Aage Krarup Nielsen wrote a novel, Helvede hinsides havet (1933) (Hell beyond the Sea), describing life in the prison system.
- In 1939, Boris Karloff was cast as Dr. Charles Gaudet in the American film Devil's Island.
- Director Frank Borzage's 1940 film Strange Cargo stars Clark Gable, Joan Crawford, Ian Hunter, and Albert Dekker as three convicts and a woman who escape from Devil's Island; they are led by Hunter's character, a possible personification of God. Peter Lorre also stars, playing a bounty hunter pursuing the others.
- In the American film To Have and Have Not (1944), Paul de Bursac (Walter Surovy) tells Harry Morgan (Humphrey Bogart): "Did you ever hear of Pierre Villemars? .... He's on Devil's Island, they sent me here to get him, to bring him back here to Martinique."
- The 1944 film Passage to Marseilles, directed by Michael Curtiz, is about five men who escape from Devil's Island to fight for Free France during World War Two.
- We're No Angels is a 1955 American movie directed by Michael Curtiz which starred Humphrey Bogart, Aldo Ray, and Peter Ustinov as escapees from Devil's Island.
- Season 2, episode 8 of The Wild Wild West, "The Night of the Bottomless Pit," (first broadcast on 4 November 1966), takes place on Devil's Island.
- Season 1, Episode 9 of The Time Tunnel, "Devil's Island," (first broadcast on 11 November 1966), was set on Devil's Island.
- Henri Charrière's memoir, Papillon (1969), ostensibly described the extreme brutality of the penal colony. He claimed to be an escaped convict but was found never to have visited the island. The book was adapted as an American movie of the same name; released in 1973, it starred Steve McQueen and Dustin Hoffman. A remake of Papillon was released in 2017, starring Charlie Hunnam and Rami Malek.
- Argentine author Adolfo Bioy Casares's novella Plan de Evasión (A Plan for Escape, 1969), is set on Devil's Island. The novella tells of a French military officer sent to the archipelago and his interactions with the island's governor and staff.
- In the fifth season of American TV series Frasier, episode 23, "Party, Party", Niles extols Seattle's exclusive Safari Club, saying "These are the people who introduced badminton to Devil's Island!"
- Alexander Miles's 1988 history of Devil's Island, including an analysis of Charrière's "memoir" based on the records of the penal colony, show that most of the latter account did not happen, were embellishments, or were feats ascribed to others. Although prisoners were not treated well, conditions were not as bad as in Charrière's account.
- In the 2003 episode "Bend Her" of the animated comedy Futurama, Devil's Island has independently entered the 3004 Olympics; its athletes appear to be wearing striped prison uniforms.
- "Devils Island" is the title of a song by the band Megadeth on their 1986 album Peace Sells... but Who's Buying? The song expresses the thoughts of a prisoner on Devil's Island about to be executed.
- Devil's Island has one full episode of Dave Salmoni's Deadly Islands series dedicated to it. Aired on Animal Planet (Discovery Channel Network) in 2015, the episode documents Salmoni's exploration of the island together with talk of its flora and fauna, dangers, and past as host to a network of penitentiaries.
- The life of Vere St. Leger Goold is the subject of a 2012 Irish theatrical play called Love All. He was a top tennis player in the late 19th century who was convicted of murder and sentenced to Devil's Island. He committed suicide there.
- Devil's Island is the title of a song by musical group CocoRosie, featured as a hidden track on the 2013 album Tales of a GrassWidow.
- In Tour de Farce, a short film starring The Inspector, the title character accompanies a prisoner to Devil's Island.
- William Willis's adventure on Devil's Island was featured in the Season 4 premiere of Drunk History on Comedy Central.
- Devil's Island is mentioned in the plot of the 2015 science-fiction book Seveneves.
- Devil's Island and other islands in the prison are mentioned in Irving Wallace's 1972 novel The Word.
- In Rob Zombie's 2022 film The Munsters, Herman and Lily vacation on the beach at Devil's Island Hotel. Herman wears a prison uniform that says Property of Devil's Island Penal Colony.

== See also ==
- Charles DeRudio
- Papillon
- George John Seaton
