= Kourou (disambiguation) =

Kourou is a commune in French Guiana.

Kourou may also refer to:

- Kourou (river), a river in French Guiana
- Kourou, Burkina Faso, a village
- Kourou/Koalou, neutral zone between Benin and Burkina Faso
- Kourou (crater), a crater on Mars

== See also ==
- Koru (disambiguation)
- Kuru (disambiguation)
