= Chorus =

Chorus may refer to:

== Music ==
- Chorus (song) or refrain, the part of a song that is repeated several times, usually after each verse
- Chorus effect, the perception of similar sounds from multiple sources as a single, richer sound
- Chorus form, song in which all verses or stanzas are sung to the same music
- Choir, a vocal ensemble
- Chorus (Eberhard Weber album), a 1985 album by jazz composer Eberhard Weber
- Chorus (Erasure album), a 1991 album by English musical duo Erasure
  - "Chorus" (Erasure song), a 1991 single from the album
- Chorus (Flying Saucer Attack album), a 1995 album by the band Flying Saucer Attack
- Chorus (Mildlife album), 2024
- Chorus (EP), a 2014 EP by Holly Herndon
- The Chorus (soundtrack), a 2004 film soundtrack
- Chorus UK, a community choir in Sheffield, United Kingdom

== Film and television ==
- Chorus (1974 film), a Bengali drama
- The Chorus (1982 film), an Iranian short film
- The Chorus (2004 film), a German-French-Swiss musical drama
- Chorus (2015 film), a Canadian drama

== Other entertainment ==
- Chorus (magazine), a Japanese manga magazine
- Chorus (video game), a 2021 space combat game
- Les Choristes, an 1887 pastel by Edgar Degas
- Ensemble (musical theatre), non-principal performers in musical theatre
- Greek chorus, a group of performers in the plays of classical Greece who comment on the dramatic action

== Companies and products ==
- Chorus Aviation, an aviation holding company in Canada
- Chorus Communications, a telecommunications company in Ireland
- Chorus Limited, a telecommunications company in New Zealand
- Chorus Motors, a subsidiary of Borealis Exploration
- Chorus Systèmes SA, a computer software company in France
- Campagnolo, a company that makes a racing bicycle groupset called "Chorus"
- Hyundai Chorus, a minibus
- Tecplot Chorus, a simulation analytics tool for engineers

== Other uses ==
- Chorus (architecture), the area of a church or cathedral that provides seating for the clergy and choir
- Chorus (gastropod), a genus of sea snails
- Chorus (horse), damsire of British Thoroughbred racehorse Chorister (horse)
- ChorusOS, an operating system for embedded systems

== See also ==
- Chorus Girl (disambiguation)
- Dawn chorus (disambiguation)
- Choir (disambiguation)
- Choru, Kohgiluyeh and Boyer-Ahmad, Iran
- Corus (disambiguation)
- Korus (disambiguation)
