= Kuru =

Kuru may refer to:

== Anthropology and history ==
- Kuru (disease), a type of transmissible spongiform encephalopathy associated with the cannibalistic funeral practices of the Fore people
- Kuru (mythology), part of Meitei mythology
- Kuru kingdom, a powerful Indo-Aryan tribe and kingdom during the Vedic period (Early Iron Age)
  - King Kuru (Vedic Hindu era), the imputed ancestral king of Indo-Aryan Kuru tribe
- Kuru (sport), a traditional Bhutanese sport
- Kuru, also called sintak, a traditional game of stones from the Philippines

== Places ==
- Kuru River, a river in South Sudan
- Kuru, Finland, former municipality, now part of Ylöjärvi
- Kuru, Iran, a village in Isfahan province
- Kuru, Nigeria, a town in the middle belt
- Kuru, Ida-Viru County, village in Alutaguse Parish, Ida-Viru County, Estonia
- Kuru, Lääne-Viru County, village in Tapa Parish, Lääne-Viru County, Estonia
- Kuru block, a community development block in Jharkhand, India
- Kuru, Lohardaga, a village in Jhankhand, India

== Transport ==
- HMAS Kuru, an Australian patrol boat operational between 1938 and 1943
- S/S Kuru, a Finnish lake steamer

== People ==
- Kuru (musician) (born 2005), American rapper and record producer
- Ahmet Kuru (born 1982), Turkish footballer
- Ayşe Kuru (born 1974), Turkish footballer
- Bartoloměj Kuru (born 1987), Austrian footballer
- Büşra Kuru (born 2001), German-born Turkish women's footballer
- Taygun Kuru (born 1990), Turkish-German footballer
- Uğur Arslan Kuru (born 1989), Turkish footballer
- Kuruvilla Pandikattu (born 1957), Indian philosopher

== Other uses ==
- Kuru (film), a Japanese supernatural horror film
- KURU (FM), a radio station (89.1 FM) licensed to serve Silver City, New Mexico, United States
- Kuru kulla, a species of dromaeosaurid theropods

== See also ==
- Kourou (disambiguation)
- Kurus (disambiguation)
- Kuru Kuru (disambiguation)
- Kurukshetra (disambiguation), Kuru (ancient Indian tribe) + kshetra (region), city and historical region in India
- Kurultai, a political and military council of ancient Mongol and Turkic chiefs and khans
