= The Choir =

The Choir may refer to:

- The Choir (alternative rock band), an indie rock band established in 1983, based in Nashville, Tennessee, originally known as Youth Choir.
- The Choir (Cleveland band), a 1960s rock band from Cleveland, Ohio, originally known as The Mods.
  - The Choir (EP), an EP by the above group.
- The Choir (film), a documentary series about a prison choir.
- The Choir (TV series), a British television documentary series about choir singing starring Gareth Malone.
- The Choir (web series), a dramedy by Issa Rae about a Black church choir
- The Choir, a 1988 novel by British author Joanna Trollope.
  - The Choir, a 1995 BBC mini series starring Anthony Way, based on Joanna Trollope's novel.
- The Choir, a radio programme about choral music on BBC Radio 3 presented by Aled Jones.

== See also ==
- Choir (disambiguation)
- The Choirboys (disambiguation)
