= Corus =

Corus may refer to:

== Places ==
- Çörüş, Gazipaşa, a village in Antalya Province, Turkey

=== Facilities and structures ===
- Corus Quay, Toronto, Ontario, Canada; an office tower

=== Fictional locations ===
- Corus, a fictional world that is the setting for the fantasy series The Corean Chronicles by L. E. Modesitt, Jr.

== People ==
=== Mythological characters ===
- Corus or Caurus, one of the Anemoi and the Roman god of the northwest wind
- Corus (mythology), in Greek mythology the spirit and personification of surfeit and disdain

== Events ==
- Battle of Corus (281 BC)

== Companies ==
- Corus Group plc, UK/Netherlands steel company
- Corus Bankshares, a financial holding group
- Corus Entertainment, a Canadian entertainment company
  - Corus Québec (formerly Radiomédia), a news-talk radio network
- Corus Hotels, hotel chain

== Sport ==
- Corus chess tournament, former name for the Tata Steel Chess Tournament held in the Netherlands
- Corus (Port Talbot) RFC, former name of Welsh rugby football club Tata Steel RFC
- Corus Steel FC, former name of Welsh football club Tata Steel F.C.

== Biology ==
- Corus (beetle), a genus of beetles in the longhorn family Cerambycidae
- Miletus croton corus (M. c. corus), a subspecies of butterfly
- Papilio corus (P. corus) or Euploea phaenareta corus (E. p. corus), a former species now subspecies of butterfly

== Other uses ==
- Corus, a fictional automobile manufacturer featured in Cross Racing Championship 2005, L.A. Street Racing and Project Torque, all of which are games developed by Invictus Games.
- CÓRus, Irish choir

== See also ==
- Barker v Corus (UK) plc (2006) a UK House of Lords decision on industrial liability in tort law
- Coordination of United Revolutionary Organizations (CORU) a U.S.-sponsored Cuban counter-revolutionary anti-communist force
- Chorus (disambiguation)
- Korus (disambiguation)
