= Quire =

Quire may refer to:

- Quire, part of the chancel of a Christian church
- Paper quire, a quantity of usually 24 or 25 (1/20 of ream) sheets of paper, though originally a pamphlet of four pages folded to make eight leaves (16 pages)
- Peter Quire (1806–1899), American abolitionist
- Quentin Quire, a fictional comic book character
- Quill & Quire, Canadian book and publishing industry magazine

== See also ==
- Choir (disambiguation)
