= Choir (disambiguation) =

A choir is an ensemble of singers.

Choir may also refer to:

== Choir or quire ==
- Choir (architecture), the area between the nave and sanctuary in a church or cathedral
- One of the divisions of a pipe organ
- A West gallery music group, consisting not only of singers, but also their accompanying village band (more often spelled quire)
- A level in the hierarchy of angels

== Choir only ==
- Choir, Mongolia, a city in Mongolia
- "Choir" (song), a song by Guy Sebastian

== See also ==
- Chorus (disambiguation)
- Choirboy (disambiguation)
- The Choir (disambiguation)
- "Choirgirl" (song), a 1979 song by Cold Chisel
- Quire (disambiguation)
