= Bringhurst (disambiguation) =

Bringhurst may refer to the following:

- Bringhurst - a village located in Leicestershire, England
- Bringhurst House - a historic building currently used as a welcome center for the Germantown White House
- Bringhurst, Indiana - a town in Indiana
- Bringhurst (surname)
