= Korus =

Korus may refer to:

- Korus, Iran
- South Korea–United States Free Trade Agreement (KORUS)
- New Zealand national korfball team, nicknamed "The Korus"
- Max Korus (born 1988), American professional racing cyclist

== See also ==
- Koru (disambiguation)
- Corus (disambiguation)
- Chorus (disambiguation)
