= Kurus =

Kurus may refer to:

- Kuruş, the Turkish currency
- Kuru (kingdom), the Indian kingdom
- Kūruš, Persian form of the name of Cyrus the Great

== See also ==
- Kuru (disambiguation)
