= Kurukshetra (disambiguation) =

Kurukshetra is a city in Haryana, India, a prominent region in ancient Indian literature.

Kurukshetra may also refer to:

- Kurukshetra district, a district of Haryana, India
- Kurukshetra (Lok Sabha constituency), an Indian parliamentary constituency
- Kurukshetra, 1946 Hindi epic poem by Ramdhari Singh Dinkar

== Films ==
- Kurukshetra (1945 film), a Hindi film
- Kurukshetra (2000 film), a Hindi film
- Kurukshetra (2002 film), a Bengali film
- Kurukshetra (2008 film), a Malayalam film
- Kurukshetra (2013 film), a Marathi film of 2013
- Kurukshetra (2019 film), a Kannada film
- Kurukshethram (1970 film), a Malayalam film
- Kurukshetram (1977 film), a Telugu film
- Kurukshetram (2006 film), a Tamil film
- Azad (2000 film), a Telugu film dubbed into Tamil as Kurukshetram

== Others ==
- Kurukshetra War, war forming the nucleus of the ancient Indian epic Mahabharata
- Kurukshetra (college festival), festival at College of Engineering, Guindy, Anna University, Chennai
- Kurukshetra (album) by Rudra

== See also ==
- Kuru (disambiguation)
- Kshetra
