= Chorus Girl =

Chorus Girl may refer to:

- "The Chorus Girl", an 1886 short story by Anton Chekhov
- Chorusgirl, a British pop band
- Chorus Girls, a 1981 musical
- A member of a chorus line

== See also ==
- Chorus (disambiguation)
- "Choir Girl"
