= Pennsylvania Abolition Society =

First American abolitionist organization

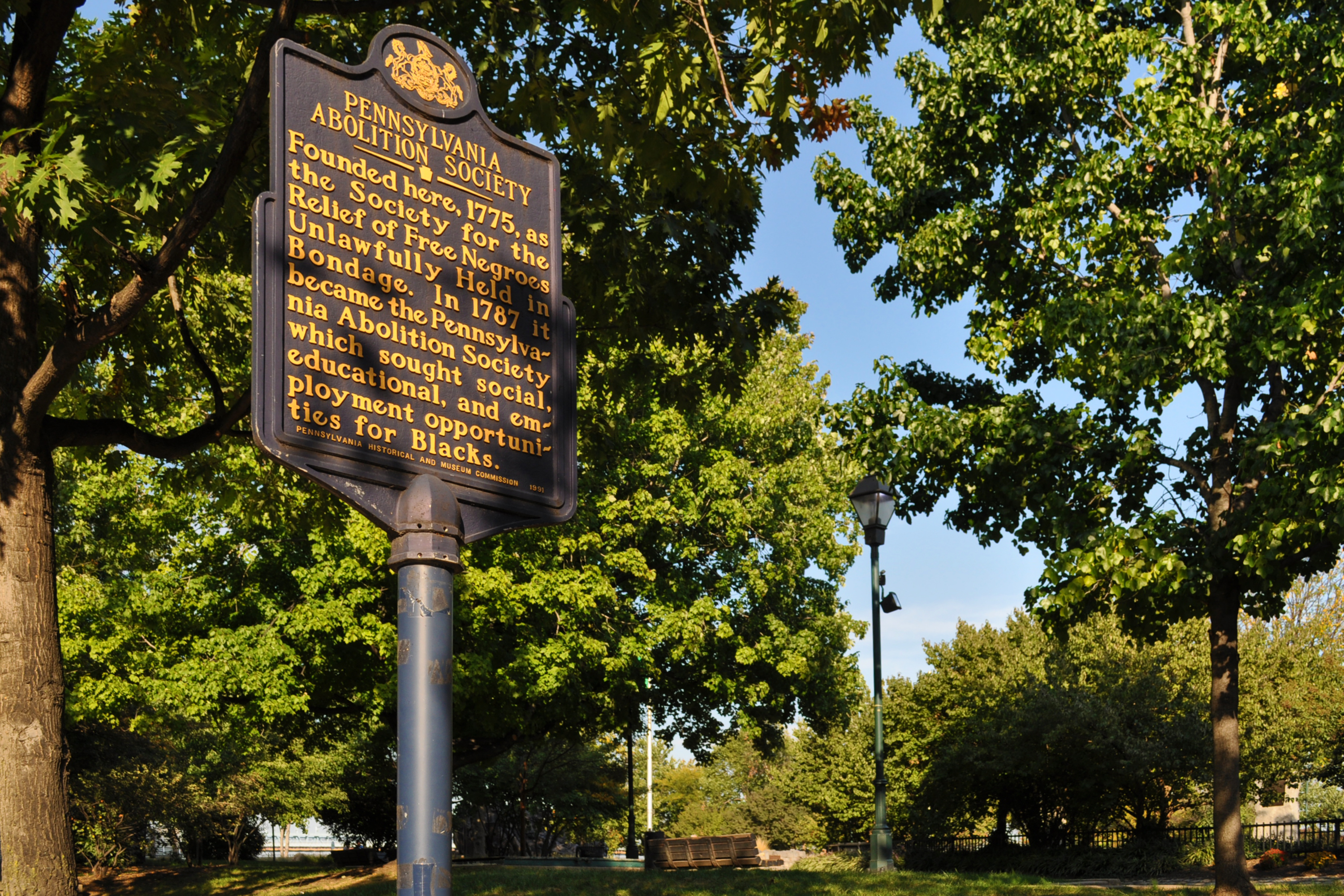
Pennsylvania Abolition Society Historical Marker at S. Front near Walnut Sts. Philadelphia, Pennsylvania

The Society for the Relief of Free Negroes Unlawfully Held in Bondage was the first American abolition society. It was founded April 14, 1775, in Philadelphia, Pennsylvania, and held four meetings. Seventeen of the 24 men who attended initial meetings of the Society were Quakers, that is, members of the Religious Society of Friends, a branch of Christianity notable in the early history of Pennsylvania.

It was reorganized in 1784 as the Pennsylvania Society for Promoting the Abolition of Slavery and for the Relief of Free Negroes Unlawfully Held in Bondage, (better known as the Pennsylvania Abolition Society) and was incorporated in 1789.

At some point after 1785, Benjamin Franklin was elected as the organization's president. The society asked him to bring the matter of slavery to the Constitutional Convention of 1787. He petitioned the U.S. Congress in 1790 to ban slavery.

The Pennsylvania Abolition (or Abolitionist) Society, which had members and leaders of both races, became a model for anti-slavery organizations in other states during the antebellum years. Prominent African-American members included Robert Purvis, who was admitted in 1842 as the Society's first Black member.

In 1984 when the Society was revived, a Pennsylvania State Historical Marker was placed on Philadelphia's Front Street below Chestnut Street, at the site of its original offices.

The Pennsylvania Abolition Society still exists, dedicated to the cause of combating racism. The oldest abolitionist organization in the United States, since the late twentieth century, it has worked to improve issues of criminal justice and the over-representation of African Americans in prison, reduction in harsh sentencing laws, and improving economic and environmental justice.

== See also ==
- New York Manumission Society
- Abolition of slavery timeline
- Pennsylvania Anti-Slavery Society
- Anthony Benezet
- James Bringhurst
- Frances Harper
- Benjamin Lundy
- Abby Davis Munro
- Thomas Paine
- Peter Quire
- Benjamin Rush
- John Greenleaf Whittier
- John Woolman
