= Saramaka, French Guiana =

Saramaka
- Neighbourhood
- Location in French Guiana
- Coordinates: 5.1561°N 52.6386°W
- Country: France
- Overseas region: French Guiana
- City: Kourou

Population (2007)
  - Total: 400−550

Saramaka (also: Saramaca) is a neighbourhood of Kourou, French Guiana. The neighbourhood is mainly populated by Saramaka maroons from Suriname who settled in the area during the construction of the Guiana Space Centre.

== Background ==
The Saramaka maroons were originally living in Suriname. They first came to French Guiana in the 19th century as freighters to the interior. During the gold rush, their services became important for the economy. In 1883, the Governor of French Guiana and the Granman (paramount chief) of the Saramaka, signed an official accord that Samarakas could stay in French Guiana under the legal authority of the Granman. The accords have never been rescinded and allow the tribe entry to French Guiana without the risk of deportation.

== Overview ==
In 1967, Saramaka maroons from Suriname arrived in Kourou to work on the construction of the Guiana Space Centre. They built a shanty town on the outskirts of Kourou. In 1968, Richard Price visited Dangogo to discover that about half of the men of the village had left for Kourou. Some of them returned, others stayed.

The Surinamese Interior War, which was fought between 1986 and 1992, resulted in more maroons crossing the border and settling in the village. In 1991, a rehabilitation program started, and 300 houses were constructed in the village. In 2006, a fire in the shanty town rendered 55 people homeless. The shanty town has been eradicated, and the village is now considered an integrated part of the town of Kourou, however social problems, crime, and limited knowledge of the French language remain. The main language spoken in the village remains Sranan Tongo, the Surinamese lingua franca.

According to the National Centre for Space Studies, Saramaka village was known for its night life, however when the Guardian visited the village in 2008, they only found some food stalls selling nasi, bami and Ti' Punch (a rum mix).

== Bibliography ==
- CUCS (2007). "Atlas socio demographique des CUCS – Portrait de territoire Kourou" (PDF) (in French). Centre de Ressources Politique de la Ville.
- Price, Sally; Price, Richard (1989). "Working for the man: a Saramaka outlook on Kourou". New West Indian Guide / Nieuwe West-Indische Gids. 63 (3–4). Leiden: Brill: 199–207. doi:10.1163/13822373-90002029.
- Price, Richard (2002). Saramaka Maroons on the Brazilian Frontier (PDF). Unshackled Spaces: Fugitives from Slavery and Maroon Communities in the Americas. Williamsburg, Virginia: College of William & Mary.
