= Abby Davis Munro =

American teacher and abolitionist

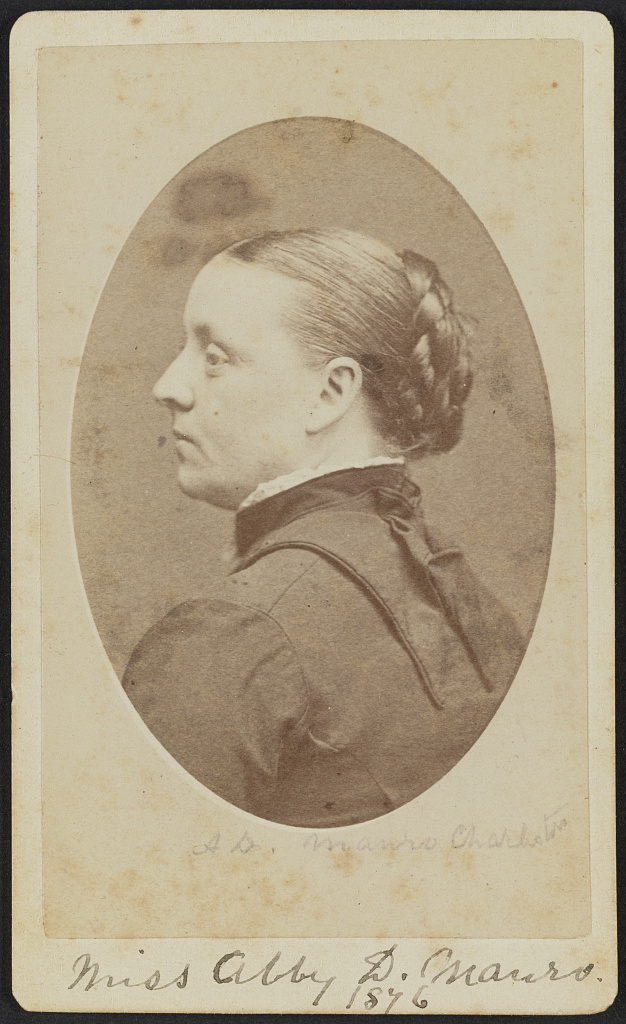
- Munro c. 1896
- Born: 1837; Bristol, Rhode Island
- Died: 1913 (aged 75–76)
- Known for: Teaching, founding the Mount Pleasant Home for Destitute Children

Abby Davis Munro (1837–1913) was a South Carolina teacher and abolitionist who operated both the Laing School in Mount Pleasant, and the Mount Pleasant Home for Destitute Children.

== Personal life and views ==
Munro was born in 1837, and never married. She was brought up in Bristol, Rhode Island before relocating to South Carolina during the Reconstruction era.

Despite widespread racism at the time, she was noted for her kindness to Black Americans, notably uncommon from white Americans. Her diary entry of January 16, 1869 reads:

"Oh what a long and dreary ride through miles of forest and swamps over muddy waters or past miserable-looking villages of Negro huts. No sign of life or thought. Everything all through the South has such a forsaken, desolate look and the people seem but half alive, as they shuffle rather than walk along. And what has but slavery done this?"

== Career ==
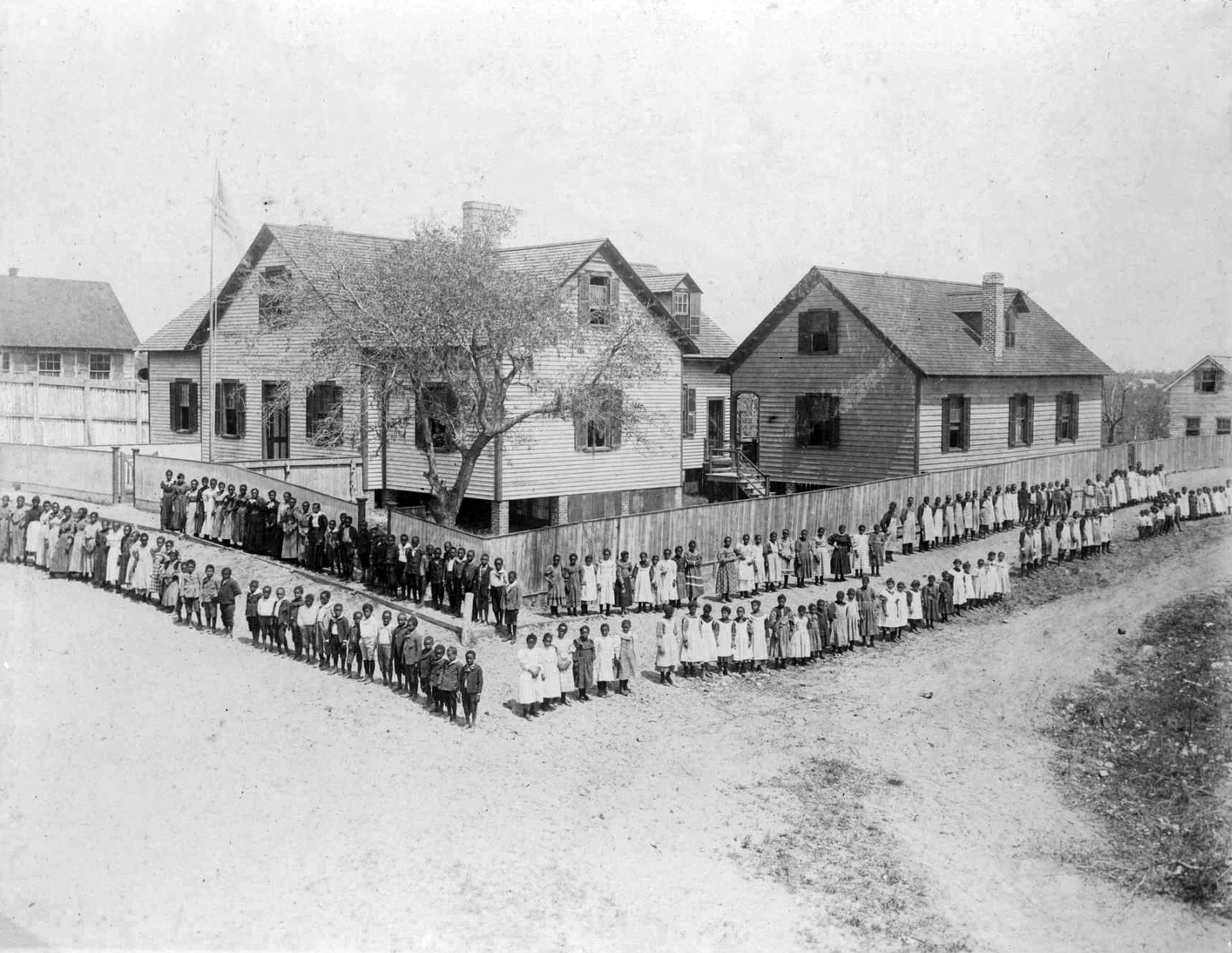
The Home for Destitute Children, c 1900

She worked for the Pennsylvania Abolition Society and also as a teacher, teaching recently emancipated African Americans, initially at the Avery Institute in Charleston before relocating to the Laing School in Mount Pleasant in 1869, where she worked as a teacher and later as the principal for 40 years.

She was known to be both strict, requiring students to memorise and recite a bible verse weekly, and also kind.

Munro ran a boarding house for Black teachers and in July 1883 opened an orphanage known informally as the Munro's school and officially the Mount Pleasant Home for Destitute Children. She sought funding from Americans in the Northeastern United States, which she used to purchase a house, which she converted into the school. Impoverished parents relinquished guardianship of their children to the school.

== Death ==
At the age of 76, Munro died at home of a heart attack, survived by her three sisters.

== Legacy ==
Munro's journals and papers are an exhibit in the University of South Carolina Libraries and also part of the collection of the National Museum of African American History and Culture shared with the Library of Congress.
