= Hôtel de Ville, Kourou =

Town hall in Kourou, French Guiana

Hôtel de Ville
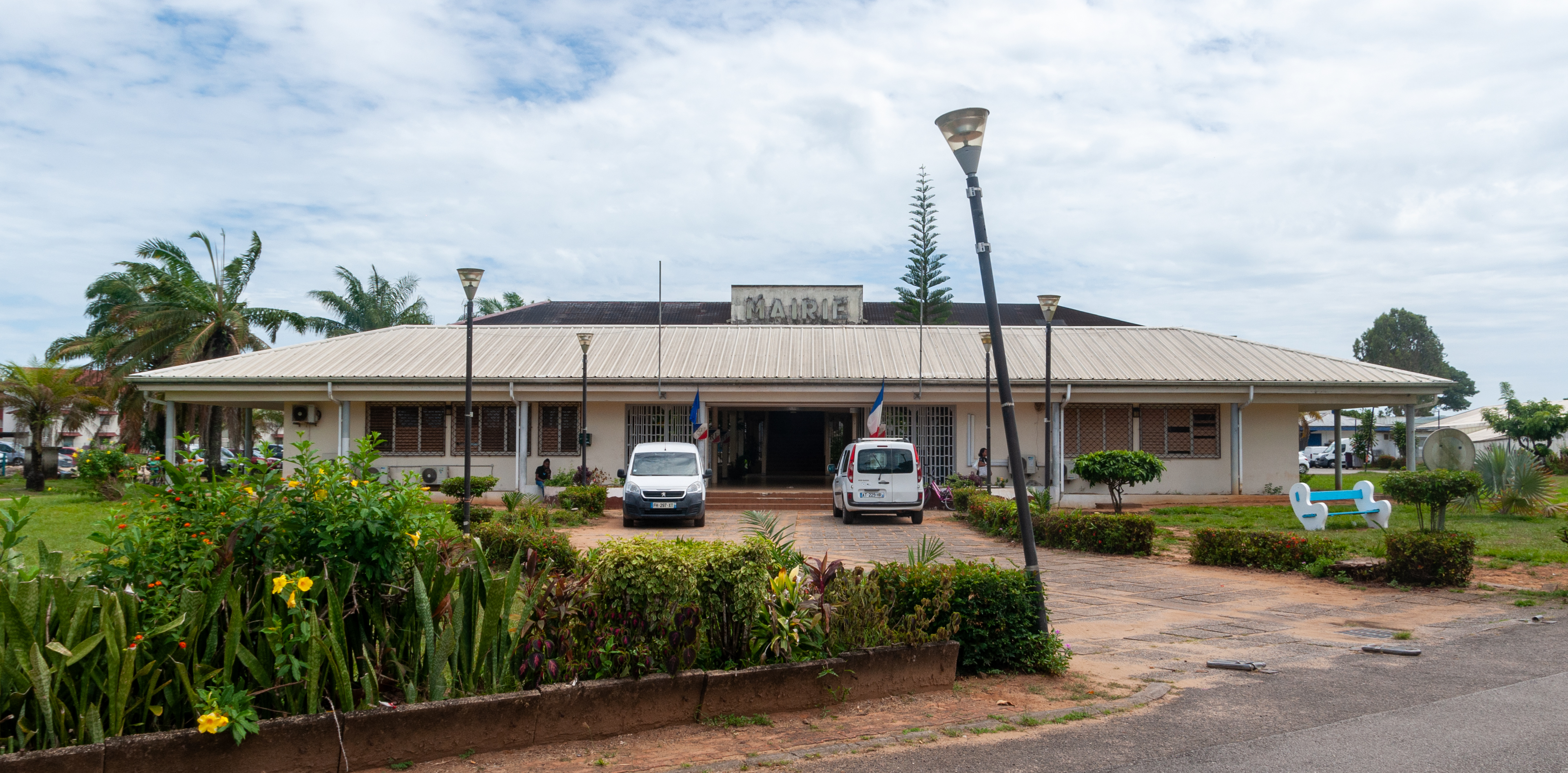
- The main frontage of the Hôtel de Ville in September 2022
- Interactive map of the Hôtel de Ville area

General information
- Type: City hall
- Architectural style: Modern style
- Location: Kourou, French Guiana
- Coordinates: 5.1580°N 52.6427°W
- Completed: c. 1979

The Hôtel de Ville (French pronunciation: [otɛl də vil], City Hall) is a municipal building in Kourou, French Guiana, on the northern coast of South America, standing on Avenue des Roches.

== History ==
In the second half of the 19th century, as the village of Kourou started to expand, civic leaders decided to commission a combined town hall and police station, as well as a school. The site they selected for the town hall and police station was a short distance to the south of the Church of Sainte-Catherine, which was the only remaining vestige of the original colonisation of the area by Étienne François de Choiseul, Duke of Choiseul in 1763.

The building was designed in the Creole style, built using timber framing techniques and was completed in the late 19th century. The design involved a symmetrical main frontage of four bays facing onto what is now Avenue Général de Gaulle. There was a central doorway on the ground floor; the building was fenestrated by casement windows with shutters on both floors and there were eaves jutting out above both floors. After the building was no longer required for municipal purposes, it became the local fire station.

After the Radical politician, Gaston Monnerville, successfully persuaded the French Government to close the penal colony in 1946, Kourou became a standard civil commune. Rapid urbanisation of the area occurred after the Guiana Space Centre was established by CNES nearby in 1965 and the launch facility was first used by the European Space Agency in 1975.

In the late-1970s, following a significant increase in population, the town council led by the mayor, Eustase Rimane, decided to commission a more substantial town hall. The site they selected, on the north side of Avenue des Roches, was approximately 800 metres (2,600 ft) to the north of the old town hall. The building was designed in the modern style, built in concrete and glass and was completed in around 1979. The design involved a rectangular shaped building of just one storey: there was a wide central entrance and a veranda on three sides. Internally, the principal room was the Salle du Conseil (council chamber).
