= Bringhurst (surname) =

Bringhurst is a surname. Notable people with the surname include:

- James Bringhurst (1730–1810), American builder and merchant
- Newell G. Bringhurst (born 1942), American historian and Mormon author
- Robert Bringhurst (born 1946), Canadian poet, typographer, and author
