= Peter Quire =

American abolitionist (1806–1899)

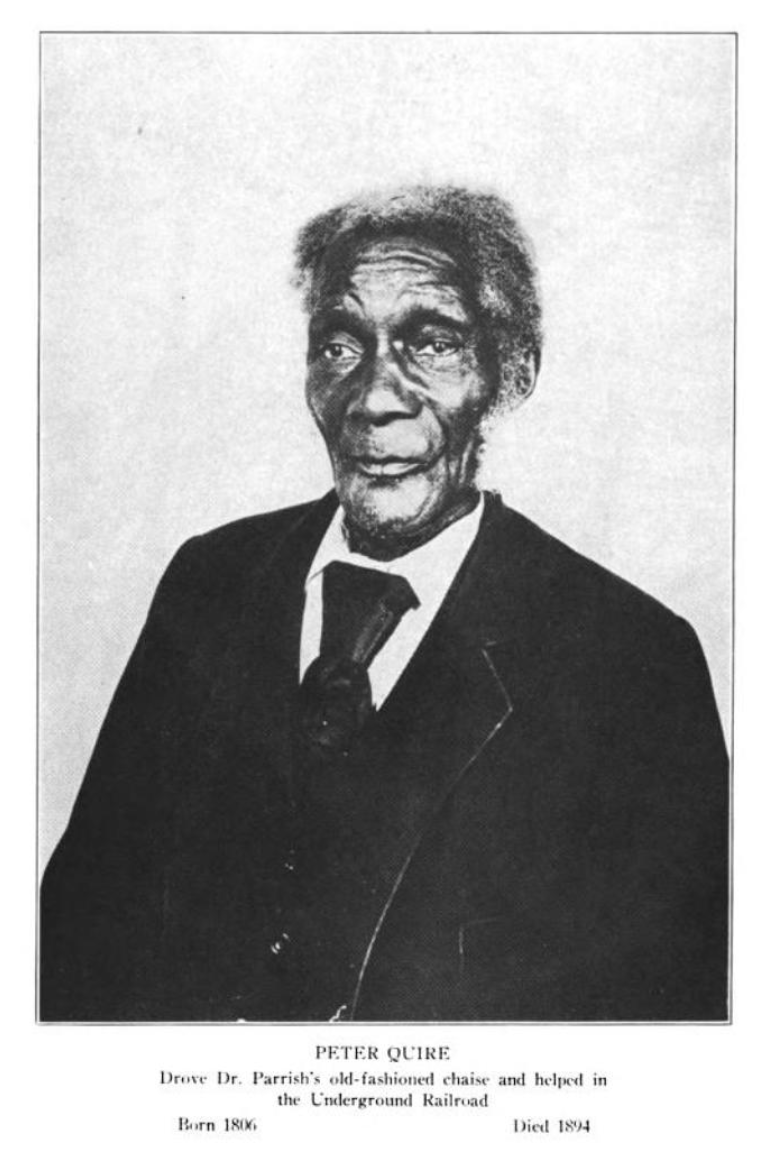
- Born: June 15, 1806; Pennsylvania, U.S.
- Died: May 5, 1899 (aged 92); Newport, Rhode Island, U.S.
- Burial place: Common Burying Ground and Island Cemetery
- Occupation(s): Abolitionist, church founder, community leader, cobbler
- Spouse(s): Maria Quire, Sarah Quire (?–1870; her death), Harriet Frances Rodman (m. 1870–1883; her death)

Peter Quire (June 15, 1806–May 5, 1899) was an American abolitionist, community leader, cobbler, and church founder. He was a member of the Underground Railroad in Philadelphia, Pennsylvania as a child; and later with his wife Harriet, he was a founder of St. John the Evangelist Church (now known as the Zabriskie Memorial Church of Saint John the Evangelist) in Newport, Rhode Island.

== Biography ==
Peter Quire was born on June 15, 1806, in Pennsylvania, U.S.. As a child, he worked as a Chaise driver for Joseph Parrish (1779–1840), a white Quaker physician and the president of the Pennsylvania Abolition Society. The Parrish house basement was a stop on the Underground Railroad, and Quire worked on the related rescue missions.

Quire married Maria Quire, and moved to Chester, Pennsylvania where he worked as a shoemaker. In 1831, they moved to Timbuctoo, New Jersey after purchasing a plot of land from the Atkinsons, another Quaker family. Timbuctoo was a newly formed Black, emancipated community, and it was in need of a school. The Quires donated their Timbuctoo deed of land for the creation of a new Black school, which it specified in the grant it was to be led by Black teachers. It is unknown what happened after they left Timbuctoo.

By 1865, Quire was living in Newport, Rhode Island with his new wife Sarah. Sarah died by 1870, and sometime after he re-married Harriet Frances Rodman. They were active in the Trinity Church in Newport, which was segregated. At this time period there was only one Black church in the state, the African Union Meeting and Schoolhouse.

On July 11, 1875, the rector from Trinity Church and several of the churchgoers meet for worship in the home of Peter and Harriet. Months later they built St. John’s Church (the building is now St. Johns’ Guild Hall) at 61 Poplar Street in the Point neighborhood, and featured a racially diverse congregation. By 1885, the church was accepted into the Episcopal Diocese of Rhode Island, and continued to be mostly self-funded.

In the 1890s, the church was struggling financially. In 1893, Sarah Titus Zabriskie donated money to the church in the memory of her mother inspiring the new name Zabriskie Memorial Church.

== See also ==
- John Johnson House (Philadelphia, Pennsylvania)
- Mother Bethel A.M.E. Church in Philadelphia, Pennsylvania
