= Chorus UK =

UK professional choir

Chorus UK Logo

Chorus UK (styled Chorus Choirs) is a large professional choir performing with the community and based in Sheffield, Leeds, Manchester, Liverpool, and Birmingham, England. The choir is managed by Andy Booth Presents, formerly Fono Productions, and the musical director is Andy Booth.

The choir performs various concerts as well as paid professional work, and is formed predominantly from singers without professional musical experience, and has grown from 50 to over 500 members. New members are recruited through regular 'come and try singing' workshops. With the ethos that 'anyone can sing' the choir welcomes all members and does not require auditions.

The choir sings a variety of popular music, from Broadway, pop, and rock. Across a term of 12 weeks, the choir prepares for a large concert at various venues including Sheffield City Hall, Royal Northern College of Music, and Leeds Town Hall. The concerts are often supported by the Sheffield Pops Orchestra and have featured guest soloists such as Lance Ellington and Jonathan Ansell.

Chorus expanded in to Manchester in April 2016 and then in to Leeds shortly after, with new branches opening in Birmingham, Nottingham, and Chesterfield opening in 2017, and Liverpool in 2019. Members of the choir supported Russell Watson on his 'Songs from the Heart' tour in July 2016. The choir was also invited to re-record a song with James Toseland and his band, Toseland, to be the anthem of the 2017 Special Olympics.

== Concerts ==
The choir have now held many large scale concerts, with a variety of other performances for charity as well as paid work for television.

| Date | Title | Description | Location |
|---|---|---|---|
| 14/07/2013 | Steel City Sings | Celebrating the City of Sheffield's music, movies and people | City Hall, Sheffield |
| 17/11/2013 | When You Believe | Songs from Disney | City Hall, Sheffield |
| 30/03/2014 | Magical Movies | Music for films old and new | Octagon, Sheffield |
| 07/06/2014 | Knowing Me Knowing You | Celebrating 40 years of ABBA and the songwriting of Benny Andersson and Björn Ulvaeus | City Hall, Sheffield |
| 29/11/2014 | Broadway Baby | The music of Broadway | City Hall, Sheffield |
| 29/03/2015 | Princes of Rock | An electric concert exploring the world of classic rock | City Hall, Sheffield |
| 21/06/2015 | Requiem for a Soldier | Marking the 200th anniversary of the Battle of Waterloo | City Hall, Sheffield |
| 13/12/2015 | Christmas Celebration | Christmas songs old and new | City Hall, Sheffield |
| 10/04/2016 | Out of this World | Space themed music from pop to classical | City Hall, Sheffield |
| 03/07/2016 | Rise of the Heroes | Music from superhero movie soundtracks | City Hall, Sheffield |
| 02/12/2016 | Christmas Celebration | Christmas classics old and new | RNCM, Manchester |
| 11/12/2016 | Christmas Celebration | Christmas classics old and new | City Hall, Sheffield |
| 19/03/2017 | Cinemagic | Magical songs from the movies | Town Hall, Leeds |
| 02/04/2017 | Cinemagic | Magical songs from the movies | City Hall, Sheffield |
| 07/04/2017 | Cinemagic | Magical songs from the movies | RNCM, Manchester |
| 25/06/2017 | Princes of Rock 2 | The best rock hits | Octagon, Sheffield |
| 02/07/2017 | Princes of Rock 2 | The best rock hits | Left Bank, Leeds |
| 21/07/2017 | Princes of Rock 2 | The best rock hits | RNCM, Manchester |
| 02/12/2017 | Christmas Celebration '17 | A festive concert for all the family | Solihull Women's Institute |
| 09/12/2017 | Christmas Celebration '17 | A festive concert for all the family | St Joseph's Church, Pudsey |
| 10/12/2017 | Christmas Celebration '17 | A festive concert for all the family | City Hall, Sheffield |
| 15/12/2017 | Christmas Celebration '17 | A festive concert for all the family | Town Hall, Stockport |
| 21/04/2018 | Hallelujah | | St Martin in the Bull Ring, Birmingham |
| 28/04/2018 | Hallelujah | | St Joseph's Church, Pudsey |
| 29/04/2018 | Hallelujah | | City Hall, Sheffield |
| 07/07/2018 | Mighty Jungle | | St Giles Church, Bramhope, Leeds |
| 14/07/2018 | Mighty Jungle | | Whittington Moor Methodist Church, Chesterfield |
| 21/07/2018 | Mighty Jungle | | St Anne's Church, Manchester |
| 29/07/2018 | Mighty Jungle | | City Hall, Sheffield |
| 08/12/2018 | Christmas Celebration | A celebration of Christmas | St Anne's Church, Manchester |
| 09/12/2018 | Christmas Celebration | A celebration of Christmas | City Hall, Sheffield |
| 15/12/2018 | Christmas Celebration | A celebration of Christmas | Whittington Moor Methodist Church, Chesterfield |
| 16/12/2018 | Christmas Celebration | A celebration of Christmas | St Joseph's Church, Pudsey |
| 06/04/2019 | Back to Broadway | An extravaganza of wonder musicals from the height of the Broadway era | St Anne's Church, Manchester |
| 07/04/2019 | Back to Broadway | An extravaganza of wonder musicals from the height of the Broadway era | Whittington Moor Methodist Church, Chesterfield |
| 13/04/2019 | Back to Broadway | An extravaganza of wonder musicals from the height of the Broadway era | St Giles Church, Bramhope, Leeds |
| 14/04/2019 | Back to Broadway | An extravaganza of wonder musicals from the height of the Broadway era | City Hall, Sheffield |
| 13/07/2019 | Magic Everywhere | A magical selection of Disney songs | St Joseph's Church, Pudsey |
| 14/07/2019 | Magic Everywhere | A magical selection of Disney songs | Dronfield Civic Centre, Dronfield |
| 20/07/2019 | Magic Everywhere | A magical selection of Disney songs | St Anne's Church, Manchester |
| 07/12/2019 | Celebration - Hope | A celebration of Hope | Alder Hey Hospital Liverpool |
| 08/12/2019 | Celebration - Hope | A celebration of Hope | City Hall, Sheffield |
| 13/12/2019 | Celebration - Hope | A celebration of Hope | Leeds College of Music |
| 14/12/2019 | Celebration - Hope | A celebration of Hope | Cosmo Rodwald Concert Hall, Manchester |
| 15/12/2019 | Celebration - Hope | A celebration of Hope | St Thomas Centre, Chesterfield |

== International appearances ==
- In June 2016 ChorusUK were invited to sing in Amsterdam to celebrate the Netherlands presidency of the EU, performing at the Noorderkerk as well as at Leiden Shopping Centre and on the seafront at Scheveningen.
- In June 2017 ChorusUK performed a number of traditional a cappella songs at Notre Dame Cathedral, as well as a more lively lineup at Disneyland Paris
- In November 2018 ChorusUK performed again at Disneyland Paris as part of Disney's Enchanted Christmas
- In November 2018 the choir also performed at Walt Disney World at part of the Christmas Parade

== Professional Work ==
- ChorusUK performed on the David Walliams TV movie Billionaire Boy in 2016
- At Christmas 2019 the choir recorded and performed several songs with Aled Jones for Celebrity Carols at Christmas
