= Koru (disambiguation) =

Koru is a symbol in Maori art.

Koru or KORU may also refer to:

== Places ==
- Koru, Yalova, a town in Turkey
- Goris, a town in Armenia also known as Koru
- Koru, Kenya, a village in Kenya
- Koru Uppalapadu, a village in India
- Colusa, California, a town in California also known as Koru

== Other uses ==
- KORU, an American radio station in Saipan, Northern Mariana Islands
- KJSR, an American radio station in Tulsa, Oklahoma, which had the call sign KORU from 1966 to 1972
- Koru (Ankara Metro), a metro station
- Koru (yacht), a luxury superyacht constructed for Jeff Bezos
- Koru Kids, a UK childcare company

== People with the name ==
- Kōru Abe (born 1994), Japanese shogi player
- Fehmi Koru (born 1950), Turkish journalist
- Şevki Koru (1913–2003), Turkish long-distance runner

== See also ==
- Korus (disambiguation)
