= CÓRus =

CÓRus is Ireland's largest choir, founded by Mary Lowe and Yvonne McDonald. In 2013, they performed on The Late Late Show.
