= Kuru Kuru =

Kuru Kuru may refer to:

- Kuru kuru/ Kururin, Herta's japanese voice line from Honkai Star Rail
- Kuru Kuru Kururin, a puzzle video game for the Game Boy Advance console
- Kuru Kururu, the first and largest village on the Soesdyke-Linden Highway in Guyana
