= Taygun Kuru =

Turkish-German footballer

Personal information
- Date of birth: 8 January 1990 (age 36)
- Place of birth: Berlin, Germany
- Height: 1.79 m (5 ft 10 in)
- Position: Left winger

Youth career
- Preußen Berlin
- –2007: 1. FC Nürnberg
- 2007–2009: Bayern Munich

Senior career*
Years	Team	Apps	(Gls)
2009–2011	Bayern Munich II	8	(0)
2011–2012	SpVgg Greuther Fürth II	0	(0)
2012–2016	SK Lauf	8	(0)
- * Club domestic league appearances and goals as of 31 December 2016

Taygun Kuru (born 8 January 1990) is a Turkish-German footballer who plays as a midfielder.

Kuru played as a youth for Preußen Berlin and 1. FC Nürnberg, before joining Bayern Munich in 2007. After two years in Bayern's youth setup, he was promoted to the reserve squad for the 2009–10 season. He made his debut on 1 September 2009, coming on as a substitute for Manuel Duhnke in a 3. Liga match against VfB Stuttgart II. He made a further seven appearances that season, but did not play at all during 2010–11 season, and was released by the club in June 2011, signing for SpVgg Greuther Fürth II shortly afterwards.
