= Kourou =

Commune in French Guiana, France

- Commune
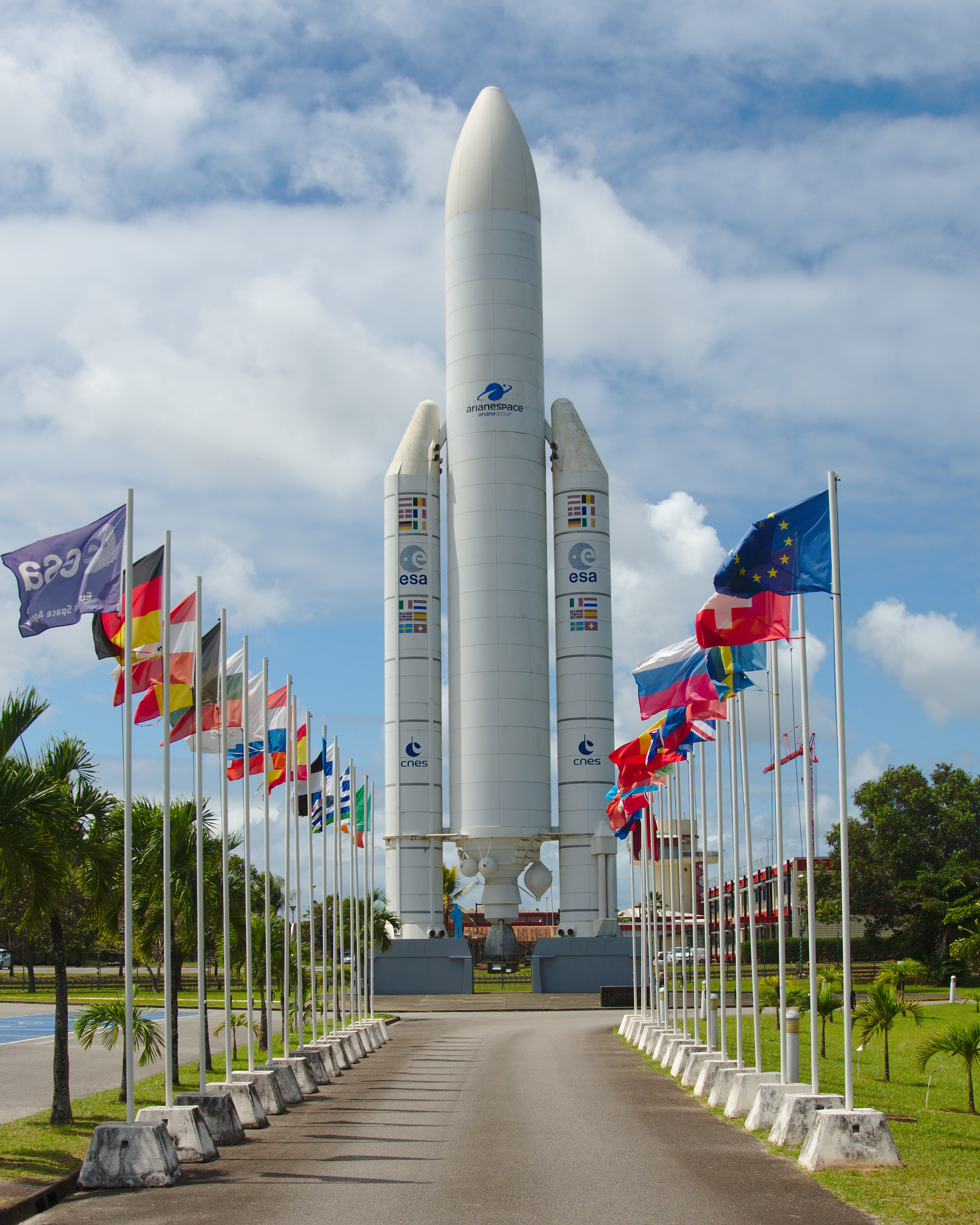
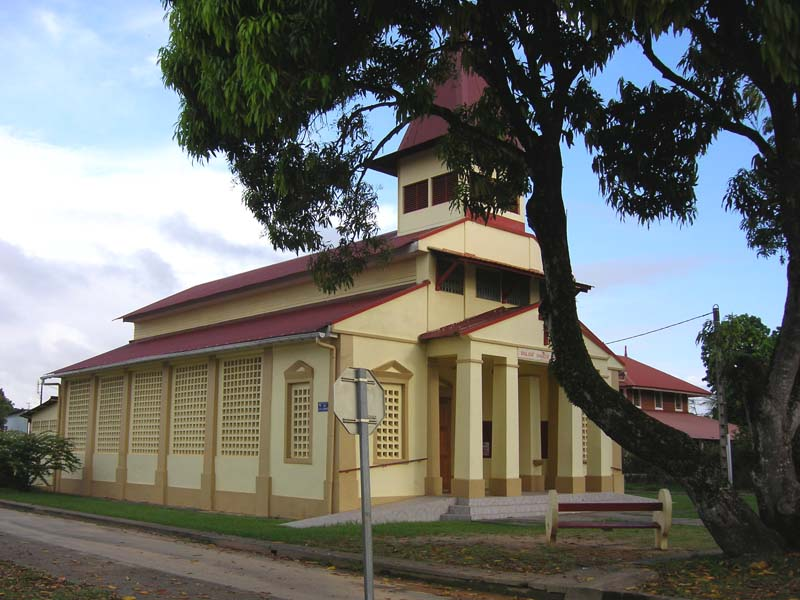
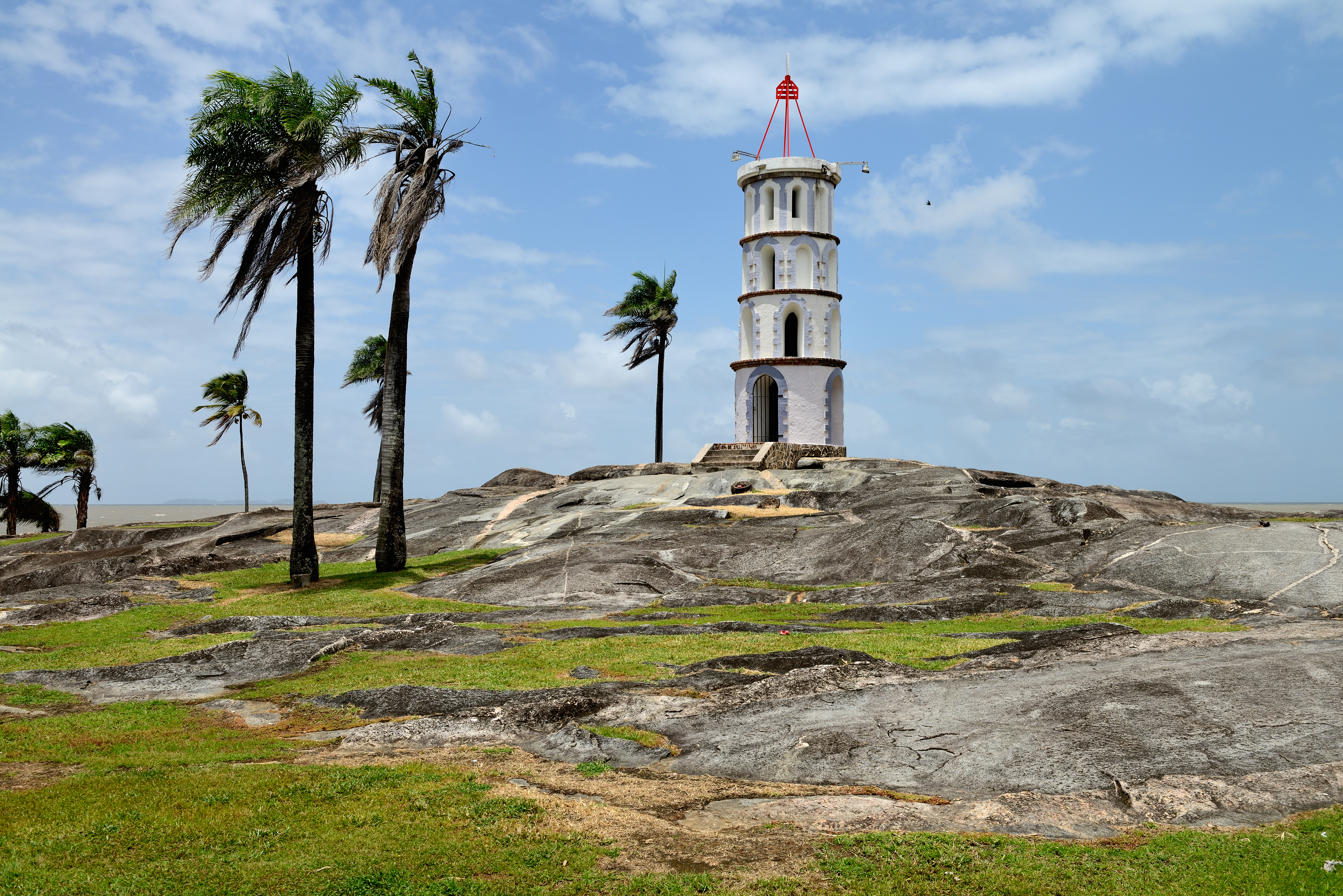
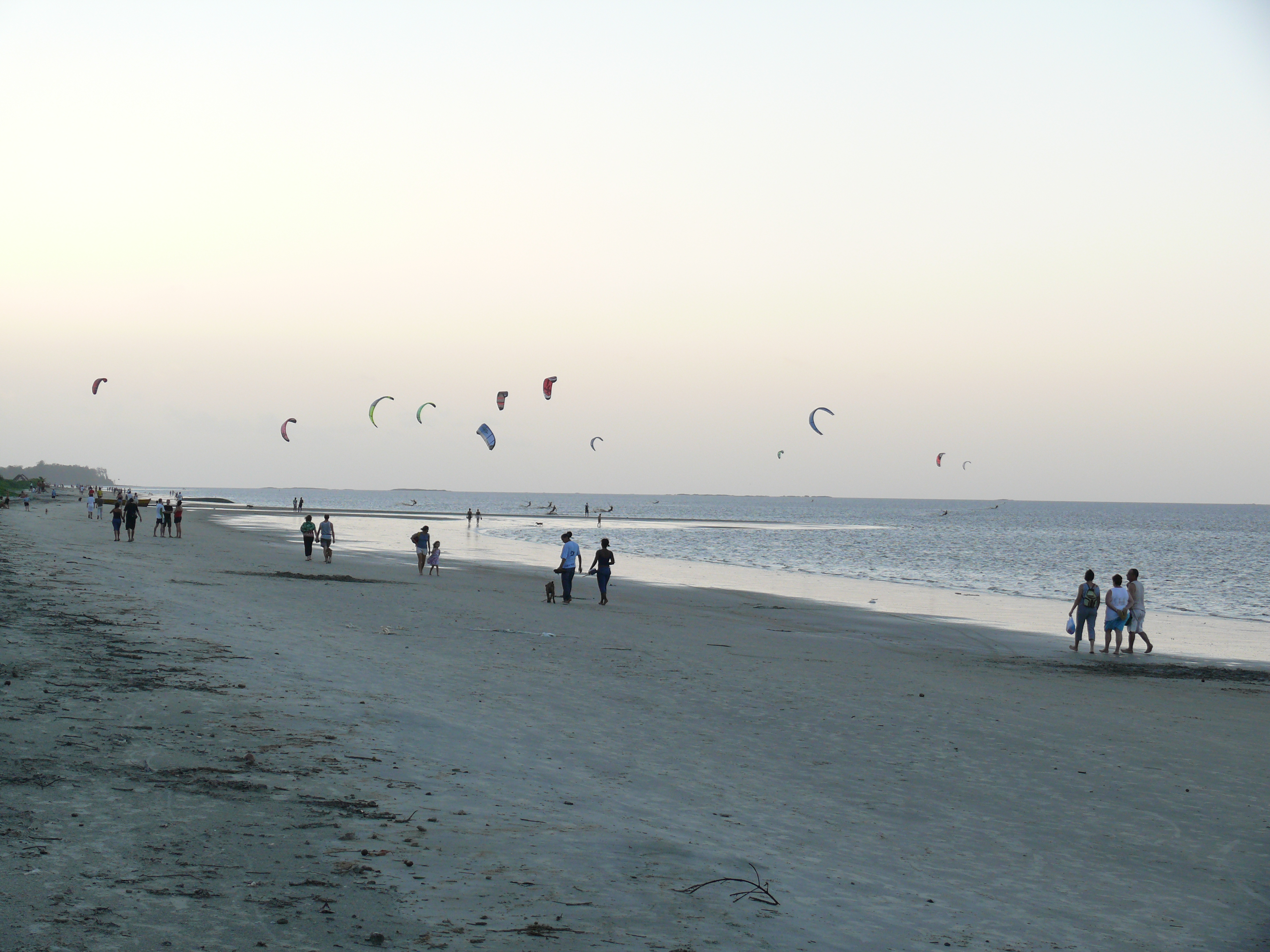
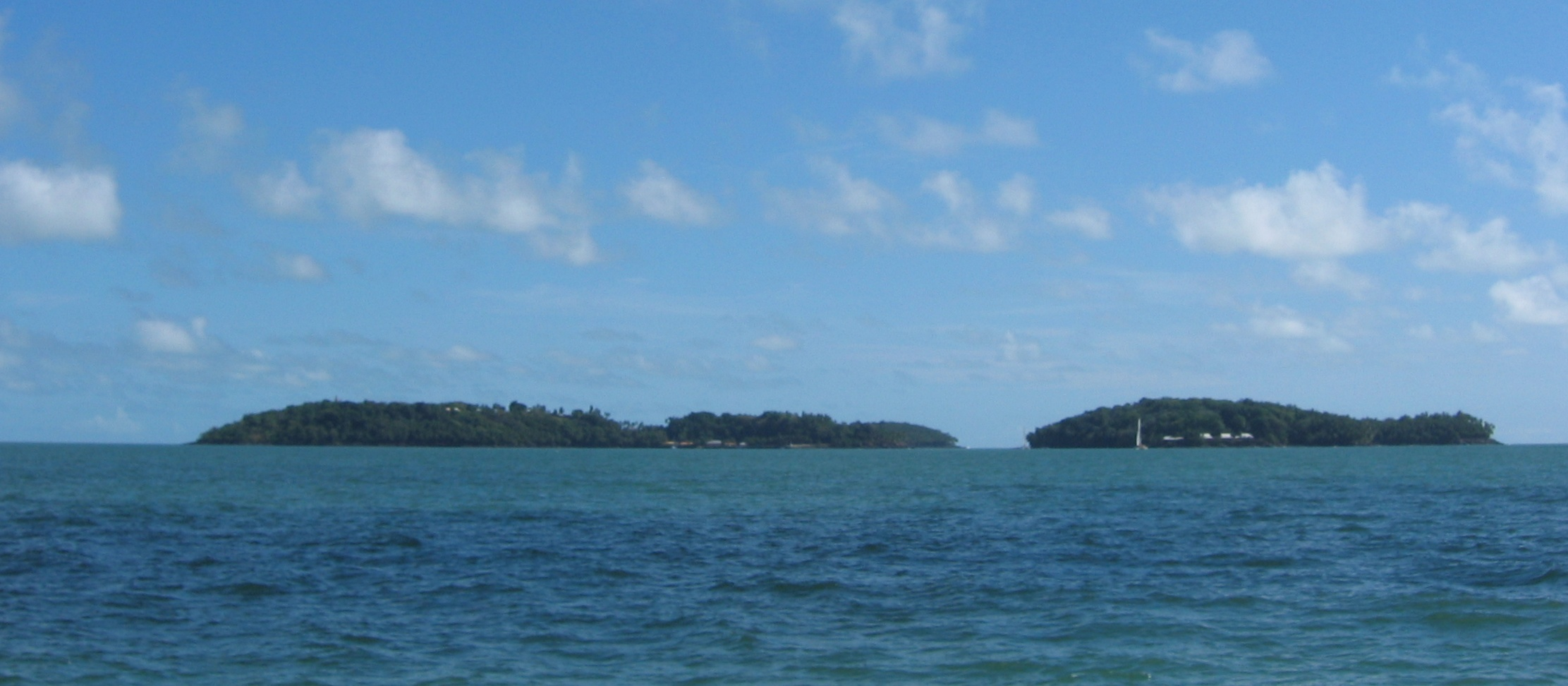
- From top to bottom, left to right: Guiana Space Centre, Sainte-Catherine Church, Dreyfus Tower, the beach of Kourou and the Salvation Islands.

- Coat of arms

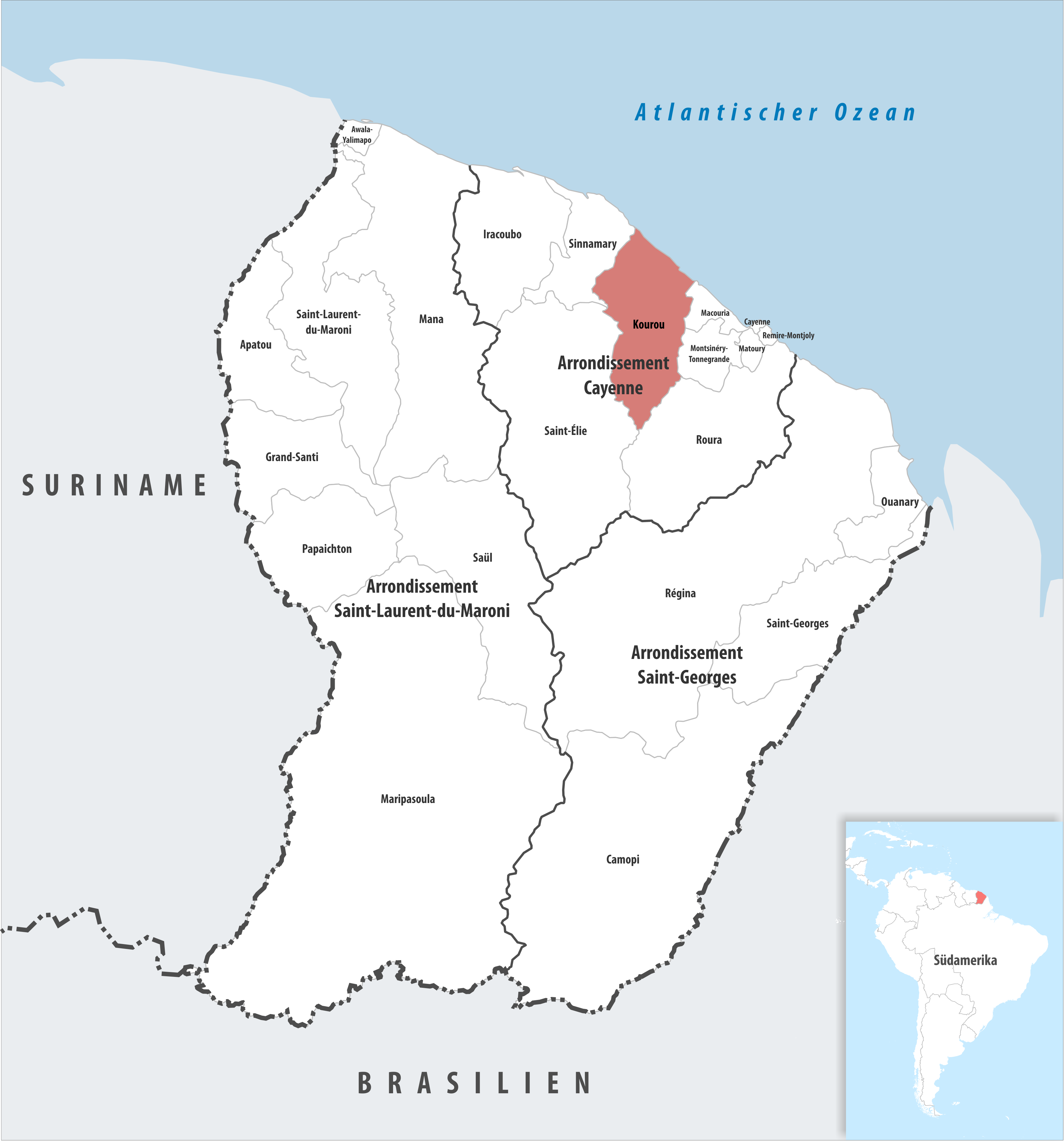
- Location of the commune (in red) within French Guiana
- Location of Kourou
- Coordinates: 5°09′35″N 52°39′01″W
- Country: France
- Overseas region and department: French Guiana
- Arrondissement: Cayenne
- Intercommunality: CC des Savanes

Government
  - Mayor (2020–2026): François Ringuet
- Area^{1}: 2,160 km^{2} (830 sq mi)
- Elevation: 2 m (6.6 ft)
- Population (2023): 24,824
  - Density: 11.5/km^{2} (29.8/sq mi)
- Time zone: UTC−03:00
- INSEE/Postal code: 97304 /97310
- ^{1} French Land Register data, which excludes lakes, ponds, glaciers > 1 km^{2} (0.386 sq mi or 247 acres) and river estuaries.

Kourou (/kuːˈruː/ koo-ROO; French pronunciation: [kuʁu]) is a commune in French Guiana, an overseas region and department of France in South America. Kourou is famous for being the location of the Guiana Space Centre, the main spaceport of France and the European Space Agency (ESA). It is an administrative district in French Guiana and the main town there.

== Geography ==
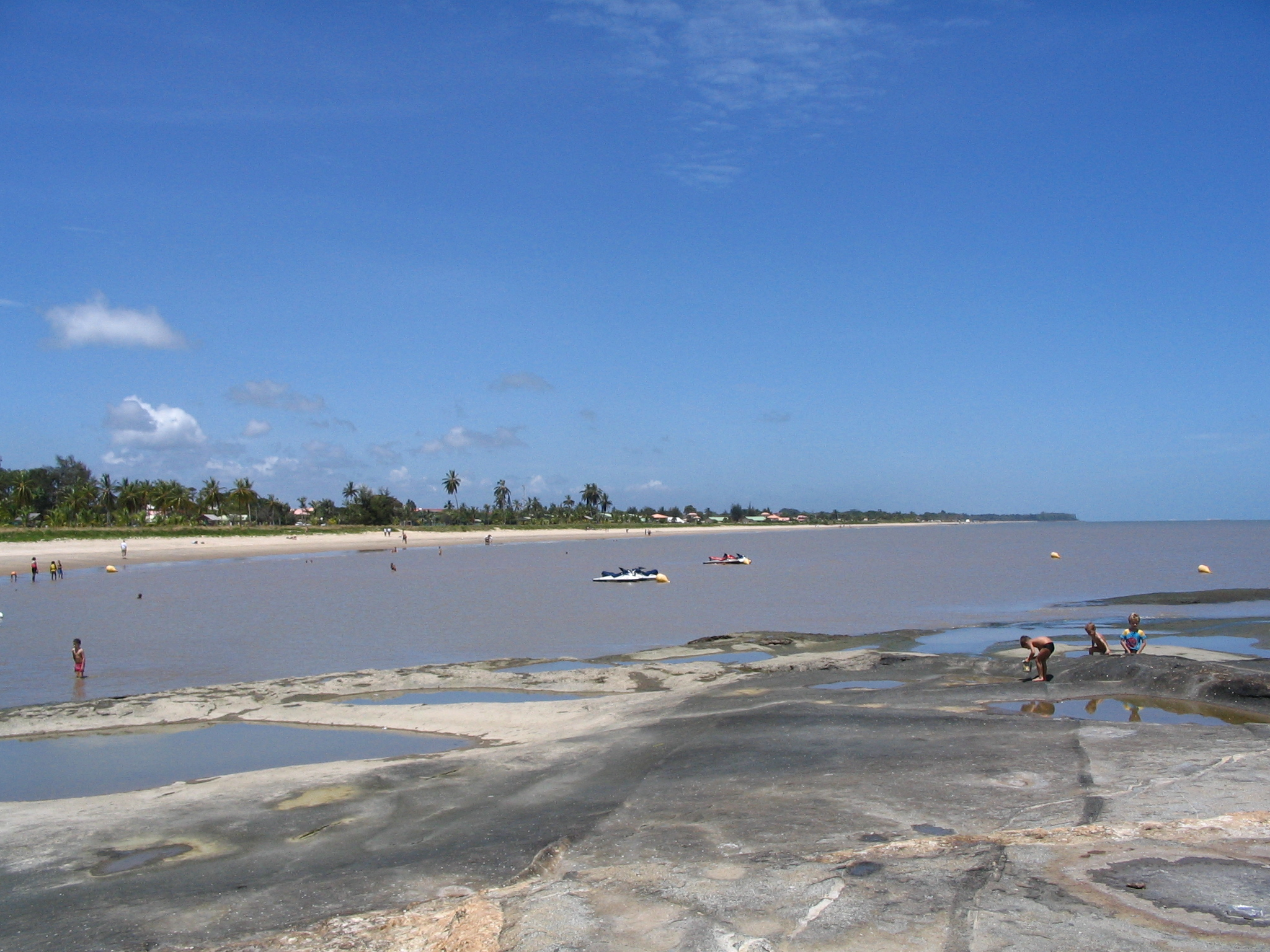
Beach at Kourou, 2005

Some 60 km (37 mi; 32 nmi) northwest of the French Guianese capital Cayenne the Kourou River empties into the Atlantic Ocean. At the mouth of this river sits the town of Kourou, which is ringed by four hills: Carapa, Pariacabo, Café and Lombard, with the Singes and Condamine mountains not far behind. There are three lakes within the town's city limits: Lake Bois Diable (where one can take lessons in jetski and other aquatic sports), Lake Marie-Claire (the smallest and calmest), and Lake Bois Chaudat (the biggest of the three; also open to sport lovers, especially canoers and kayakers). Long white sand beaches and some rocky outcrops line the town's ocean coast, the riverbank and all points inland consisting mostly of mangrove and dense tropical rainforest.

The town had a population of 24,824 inhabitants in 2023. Its inhabitants can be classified into three ethnic groups of roughly equal size:

- Indigenous peoples (mostly Kalina - also called Galibi), Creoles, Maroons (Boni and Saramaka),
- Whites (mostly French, from Metropolitan France), and
- Foreigners (Brazilians, Surinamese, Hmong, Haitians, Guyanese, etc.)

The Saramaka mostly settled in the quartier Saramaka, along the river. In 2006, a fire rendered 55 people homeless.

Guiana in general has a high level of crime compared to the rest of France's departments; Kourou has an average of two armed robberies a day. A march protesting the high level of insecurity felt by most of the population was held in Kourou on 27 October 2006. Shopkeepers of Chinese descent in particular are often targeted by armed robbers, their cash registers emptied and some products stolen.

Kourou is the port of departure for those going to the Salvation Islands (French: Iles du Salut), of which the most famous is Devil's Island. It is also common for many to go up the river in canoes on weekends to camp in the forest.

The Guiana Space Centre, where the European Space Agency starts missions, is located a little behind and outside the town. Part of the town and the islands are closed during rocket launches.

In 2010, the Kourou solar power plant was built near Kourou on Aubanèle Savannah. It is the largest solar power plant in Overseas France.

== History ==
=== Era of Kalini people ===
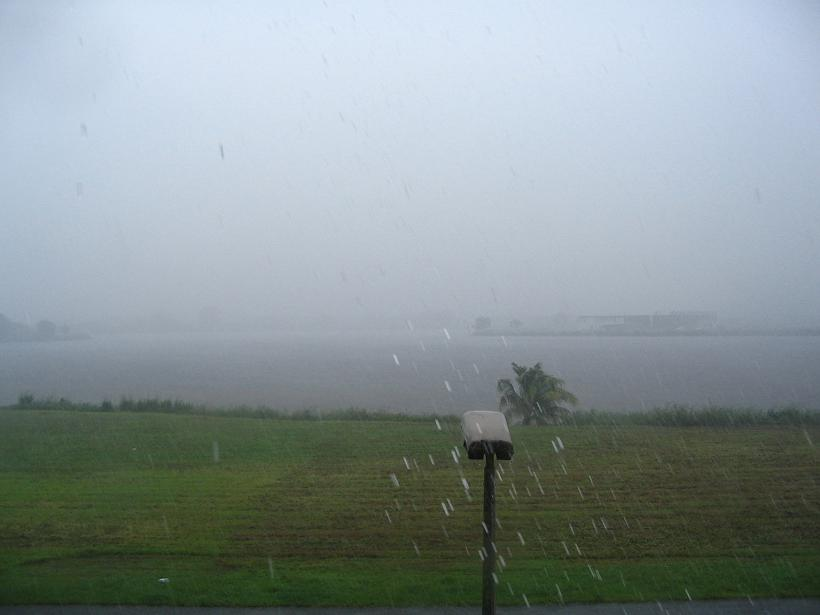
Kourou's Bois Chaudat lake during the rainy season.

Not much is known of the pre-colonial era. The area was mostly populated by Kalina, or Galibi before the arrival of the French in the late 17th century.

Not far from the town at Les Roches Gravées (The Carved Rocks), indigenous art can be seen on the rock walls.

=== Early colonization ===
Vicente Yáñez Pinzón sailed along most of the north coast of South America and passed by the current location of Kourou in 1500.

The Jesuits Lombard and Creuilly baptised a few Galibis at the church of Saint Nicholas in Cayenne in December 1710 and returned with them soon after to farm the land at Guatémala, across the river from Kourou. The Society of Jesus was disbanded (in Guiana) in 1762, however, and Kourou was nothing more than a small village until the arrival of the Expedition.

In 1744, La Condamine, in charge of the expedition sent to Peru in 1735 to determine the length of a degree of the meridian arc in the neighbourhood of the equator, passed by and gave his name to one of the mountains behind Kourou.

=== Expedition ===
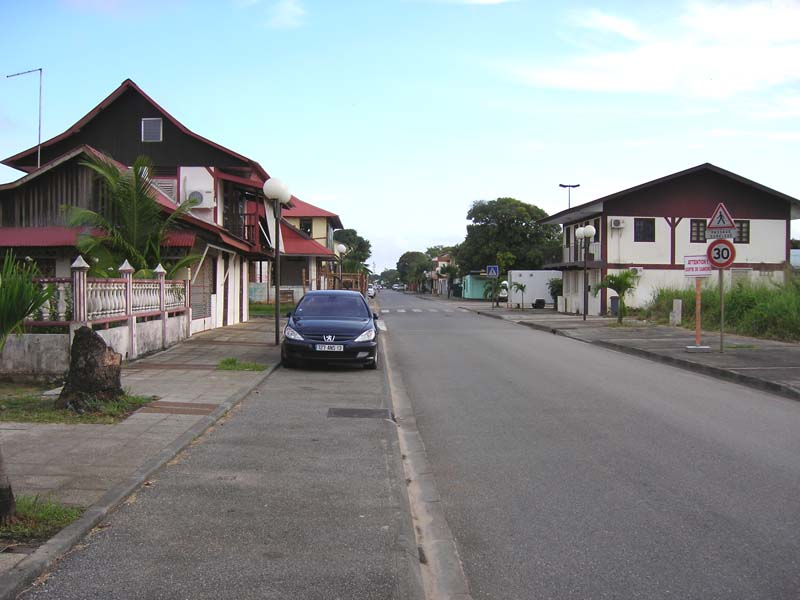
The Bourg, 2006

The mission at Kourou being abandoned by the Jesuits, the engineers Mentelle and Tugny designed the layout of the future town. This resulted in the neighbourhood called the Bourg, around the Church of Saint Catherine and next to the port on the river.

That same year, 1763, as agreed in the Treaty of Paris, Great Britain took control of New France. Having lost their largest and richest colony, the French decided to send a large expedition to Guiana, commanded by Choiseul. Around 10,000 to 12,000 people, mostly Frenchmen, tempted by stories of an El Dorado on the other side of the ocean, settled in Kourou.

The small town, surrounded by marshes and rainforest, was unprepared for such a massive influx of people, and around 6,000 of the pioneers died within the year due to fevers and other illnesses. Those remaining fled to the îles du Salut, free of mosquitoes due to constant winds, to recover before being repatriated to Metropolitan France. Hence the name, "Salvation Islands." Previously they had been known as the îles du Diable ("Devil's Islands"), and one of the islands retains the name to this day.

The failure of the Expedition only served to discourage settling in Guiana. The colony earned the nickname Enfer Vert ("Green Hell"), which it is still trying to shake. No other project of mass colonisation was undertaken, and the population of Whites was always drastically lower than that of the slaves. The population of the colony, of all races, did not rise above 20,000 until the gold rush (starting in 1855), the second abolition of slavery in 1848 and the founding of the prisons.

=== Prisons ===
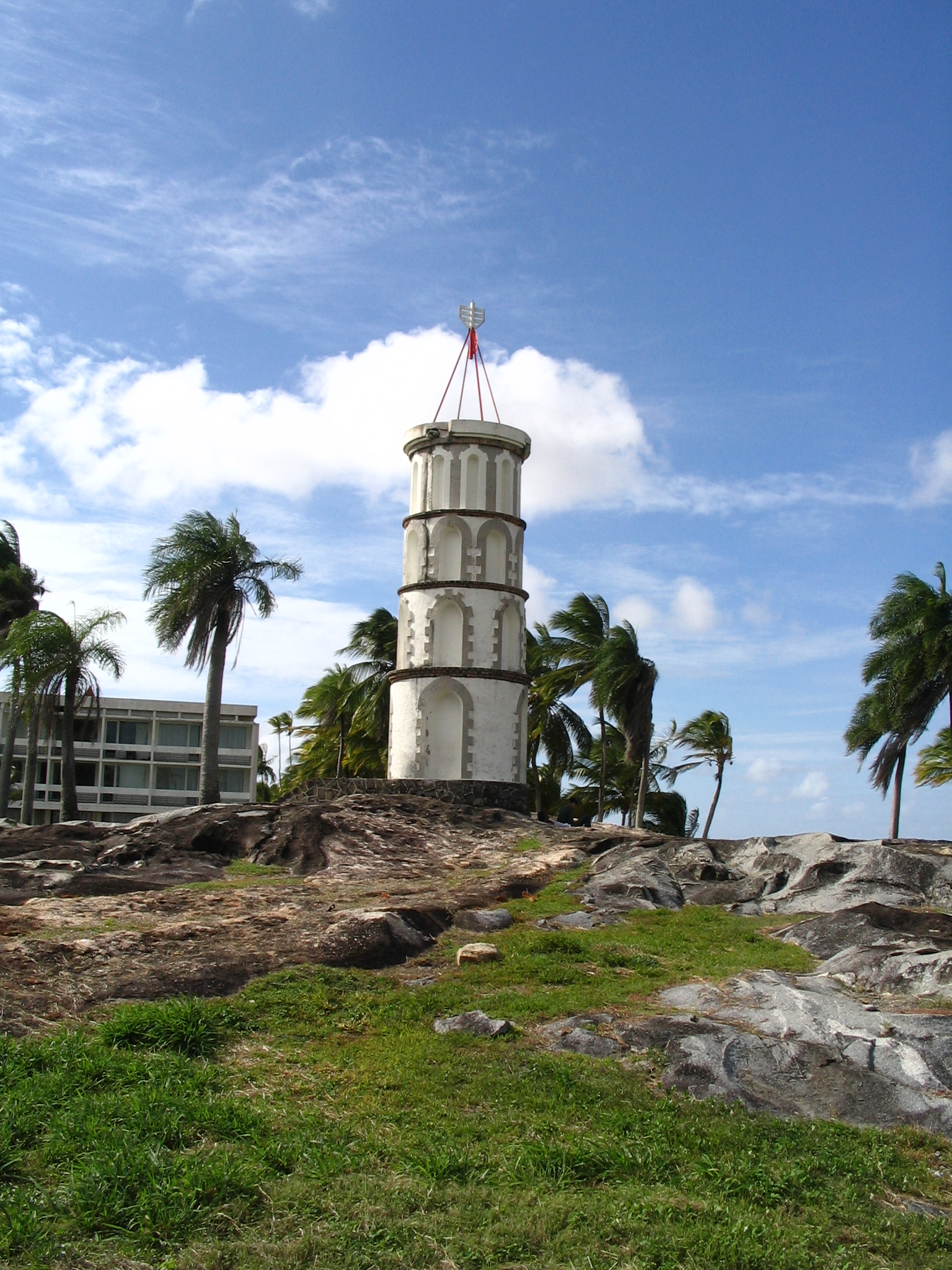
The Dreyfus Tower on the Pointe des Roches, 2005

Kourou was formerly the home of the "Kourou Prison" which was one of the main prisons in French Guiana, and which was also a part of the notorious Devil's Island Prison System. The Kourou Prison was dedicated mostly to agriculture.

In 1852 the three main islands off of Kourou's coast, the Salut island group (which included Devil's Island) also became prisons. These island prisons held mostly political prisoners, as well as some of France's toughest criminals. The first prisoners arrived in 1862.

In 1938, a law was passed prohibiting the transport of any new prisoners from France to French Guiana. In 1946 eight years later, the Kourou Prison was finally shut down, while some prisoners were kept in other Guyanese prisons until as late as 1953.

After the closing of the prison, most of the prison buildings were demolished to make room for the Hôtel des Roches, but some vestiges of that period remain. One notable remnant of the prison is the Dreyfus Tower, which stands where the river meets the ocean. This tower was used in pre-radio days to communicate with the islands via Semaphore. Other prison ruins that remain are the prison bakery — now on private property, but still visible from a cul-de-sac — and an old prison fountain near the moucaya palm trees.

=== CSG and the French Foreign Legion ===
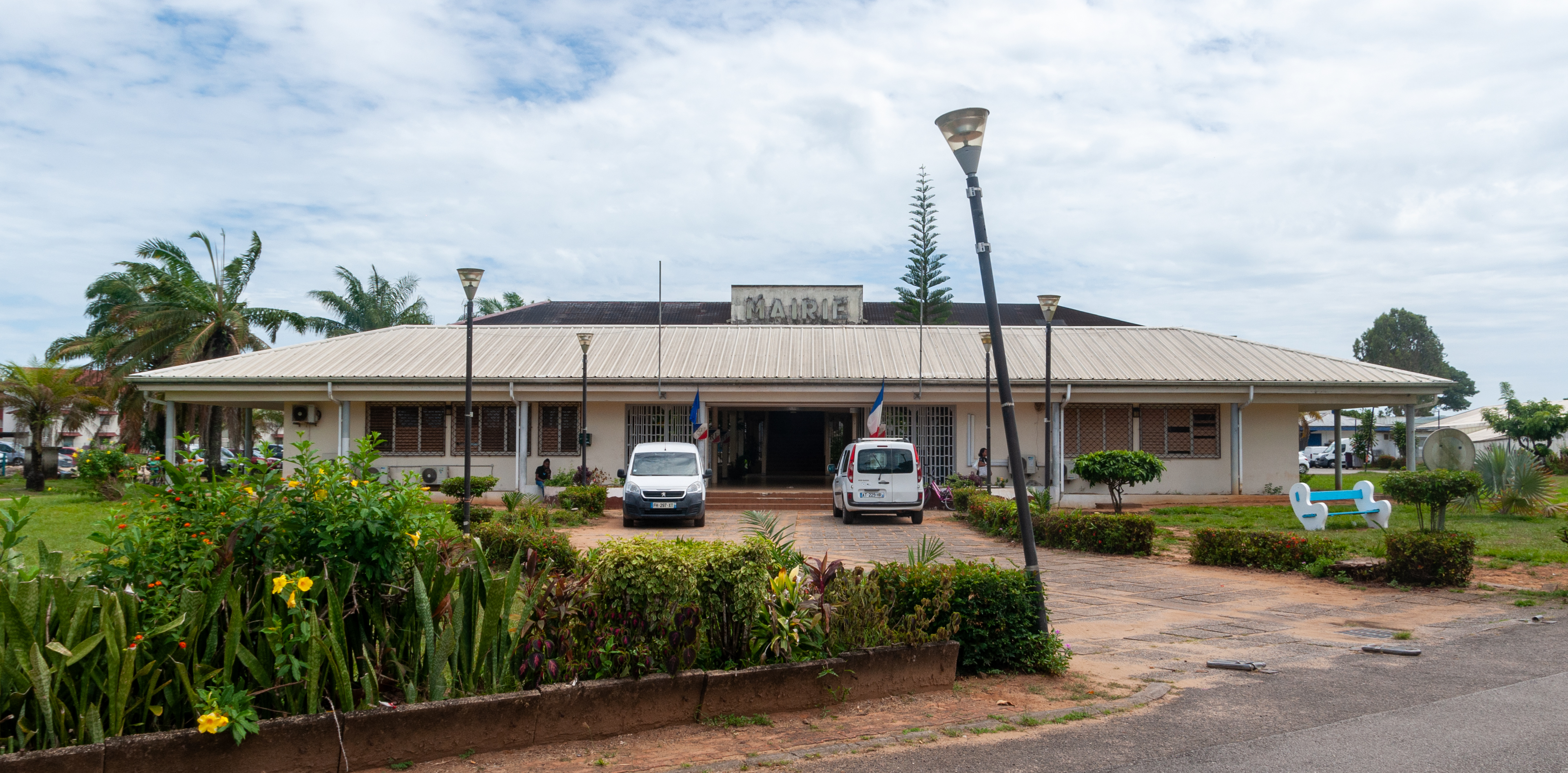
The Hôtel de Ville

In 1965, the Guiana Space Centre was founded a little behind the town by the CNES. With the launch facility being used by the European Space Agency since 1975, the urbanisation of Kourou began in earnest.

The 3rd Foreign Infantry Regiment of the French Foreign Legion, whose mission is to protect the CSG, has had a base in the Forget neighbourhood since 1973. They clashed with the Creoles in 1985 and 2006.

The Hôtel de Ville was completed in around 1979.

== Demographics ==
=== Historical population ===
Historical population

Year	Pop.	±% p.a.
1961	659	—
1967	3,117	+29.45%
1974	4,720	+6.11%
1982	7,061	+5.60%
1990	13,873	+8.79%

Year	Pop.	±% p.a.
1999	19,107	+3.63%
2007	25,688	+3.86%
2012	25,490	−0.15%
2017	25,685	+0.15%
2023	24,824	−0.57%

Source: SPLAF, INSEE

=== Migrations ===
The places of birth of the 26,221 residents in the commune of Kourou at the 2015 census were the following:

- 48.7% were born in French Guiana
- 16.0% in Metropolitan France
- 2.0% in Martinique
- 0.9% in Guadeloupe
- 0.4% in other parts of Overseas France
- 32.2% in foreign countries (notably Suriname, followed by Haiti and Brazil); among these, 30.7% were immigrants and 1.4% were children of French citizens born abroad

These were the countries of birth of the immigrants living in the commune of Kourou at the 2009 census:

- born in Suriname: 3,035
- born in Haiti: 1,857
- born in Brazil: 1,806
- born in other countries: 1,327

== Climate ==
Like most of French Guiana, Kourou has a tropical monsoon climate (Köppen Am) with a short dry season centered between the months of August and October when the Intertropical Convergence Zone is furthest north. During the remainder of the year rainfall is always heavy. Between November and July a total of 2,396.4 millimetres or 94.35 inches can be expected in nine months, with rain on most days and very cloudy skies.

Climate data for Kourou (CSG, altitude 17m, 1991–2020 normals, extremes 1965–present)
Month	Jan	Feb	Mar	Apr	May	Jun	Jul	Aug	Sep	Oct	Nov	Dec	Year
Record high °C (°F)	31.3 (88.3)	31.7 (89.1)	31.6 (88.9)	31.8 (89.2)	32.4 (90.3)	33.0 (91.4)	33.9 (93.0)	33.7 (92.7)	34.2 (93.6)	34.5 (94.1)	33.5 (92.3)	32.7 (90.9)	34.5 (94.1)
Mean daily maximum °C (°F)	29.2 (84.6)	29.3 (84.7)	29.6 (85.3)	29.7 (85.5)	29.7 (85.5)	29.9 (85.8)	30.6 (87.1)	31.2 (88.2)	31.9 (89.4)	32.2 (90.0)	31.4 (88.5)	30.0 (86.0)	30.4 (86.7)
Daily mean °C (°F)	26.6 (79.9)	26.7 (80.1)	27.0 (80.6)	27.1 (80.8)	26.9 (80.4)	26.6 (79.9)	26.7 (80.1)	27.1 (80.8)	27.4 (81.3)	27.6 (81.7)	27.4 (81.3)	26.9 (80.4)	27.0 (80.6)
Mean daily minimum °C (°F)	24.0 (75.2)	24.1 (75.4)	24.5 (76.1)	24.5 (76.1)	24.2 (75.6)	23.4 (74.1)	22.9 (73.2)	22.9 (73.2)	22.9 (73.2)	22.9 (73.2)	23.3 (73.9)	23.8 (74.8)	23.6 (74.5)
Record low °C (°F)	19.2 (66.6)	20.0 (68.0)	19.5 (67.1)	19.0 (66.2)	20.0 (68.0)	20.0 (68.0)	20.0 (68.0)	19.1 (66.4)	19.1 (66.4)	19.0 (66.2)	18.1 (64.6)	18.8 (65.8)	18.1 (64.6)
Average precipitation mm (inches)	319.5 (12.58)	251.6 (9.91)	246.4 (9.70)	405.6 (15.97)	489.0 (19.25)	382.2 (15.05)	165.1 (6.50)	82.3 (3.24)	28.0 (1.10)	41.5 (1.63)	124.7 (4.91)	273.6 (10.77)	2,809.5 (110.61)
Average precipitation days (≥ 1.0 mm)	19.6	17.4	16.9	20.1	24.7	23.8	16.5	8.3	3.9	5.9	11.6	19.9	188.5
Mean monthly sunshine hours	118.6	120.8	150.9	145.2	145.5	174.9	223.4	253.8	264.3	258.1	203.8	150.9	2,210.2
Source 1: Meteo France
Source 2: Meteociel (sunshine 1981-2010)

Climate data for Kourou (Plage, altitude 3m, 1991–2020 normals, extremes 1995–present)
Month	Jan	Feb	Mar	Apr	May	Jun	Jul	Aug	Sep	Oct	Nov	Dec	Year
Record high °C (°F)	32.0 (89.6)	32.2 (90.0)	32.7 (90.9)	32.2 (90.0)	33.3 (91.9)	33.5 (92.3)	34.7 (94.5)	35.5 (95.9)	35.7 (96.3)	35.8 (96.4)	33.2 (91.8)	32.5 (90.5)	35.8 (96.4)
Mean daily maximum °C (°F)	29.3 (84.7)	29.3 (84.7)	29.7 (85.5)	29.9 (85.8)	29.9 (85.8)	30.0 (86.0)	30.7 (87.3)	31.5 (88.7)	31.8 (89.2)	31.9 (89.4)	31.3 (88.3)	30.1 (86.2)	30.4 (86.7)
Daily mean °C (°F)	27.2 (81.0)	27.2 (81.0)	27.7 (81.9)	27.7 (81.9)	27.4 (81.3)	27.2 (81.0)	27.4 (81.3)	28.0 (82.4)	28.4 (83.1)	28.7 (83.7)	28.4 (83.1)	27.7 (81.9)	27.8 (82.0)
Mean daily minimum °C (°F)	25.1 (77.2)	25.2 (77.4)	25.6 (78.1)	25.5 (77.9)	25.0 (77.0)	24.3 (75.7)	24.1 (75.4)	24.5 (76.1)	25.0 (77.0)	25.5 (77.9)	25.5 (77.9)	25.2 (77.4)	25.0 (77.0)
Record low °C (°F)	21.8 (71.2)	21.3 (70.3)	21.7 (71.1)	21.6 (70.9)	22.5 (72.5)	21.2 (70.2)	22.1 (71.8)	22.3 (72.1)	22.5 (72.5)	23.0 (73.4)	22.7 (72.9)	21.6 (70.9)	21.2 (70.2)
Average precipitation mm (inches)	282.4 (11.12)	236.7 (9.32)	207.9 (8.19)	356.8 (14.05)	471.6 (18.57)	340.4 (13.40)	159.3 (6.27)	67.9 (2.67)	23.7 (0.93)	36.7 (1.44)	94.8 (3.73)	245.1 (9.65)	2,523.3 (99.34)
Average precipitation days (≥ 1.0 mm)	17.6	15.5	14.9	18.5	24.3	22.1	15.4	6.7	2.9	4.7	9.8	18.8	171.2
Source: Météo-France

== Economy ==
Kourou's economy is largely dominated by the CSG, from which the European Ariane rockets are launched, as well as the Russian Soyuz and the Italian Vega rockets.

== Transportation ==
Kourou is served by Kourou Airport, located 2 kilometres (1.2 mi; 1.1 nmi) at the west of the city.

== Politics ==
Kourou is the main town on an "administrative district" of French Guiana. Such a district is equivalent to a county in the United States. Kourou is represented in Paris as part of French Guiana's 2nd constituency, which has been held by former Kourou city councilor Davy Rimane since 2022.

== Tourism ==
- The Guiana Space Centre (French: Centre spatial guyanais; CSG) gets many visitors all year round.
- The Musée de l'Espace is a museum devoted to space and space exploration.
- The Salvation Islands: Of the three islands, only two, Île-Royale and Île Saint-Joseph, can be visited. The third is Devil's Island.
- Les Roches gravées: Indigenous rock art, not far from the small industrial zone called Pariacabo.
- There are several marked public footpaths in the jungle, of which the most well-known and used is the one on the Montagne des Singes.
- Kourou River: Many people go up the river on canoes or small boats to camp along the shore in open dwellings, or simply in hammocks.
- The ocean may not be clear (it is brown due to the Amazonian silt), but both it and the beaches are clean.

== In popular culture ==
This commune is featured in the 2021 video game Battlefield 2042 as the setting of multiplayer map Orbital.

The Guiana Space Centre is featured in Neal Stephenson's sci-fi novel Seveneves, along with the nearby Devil's Island.

== See also ==
- Communes of French Guiana
- Saramaka, French Guiana
