= James Bringhurst =

American carpenter

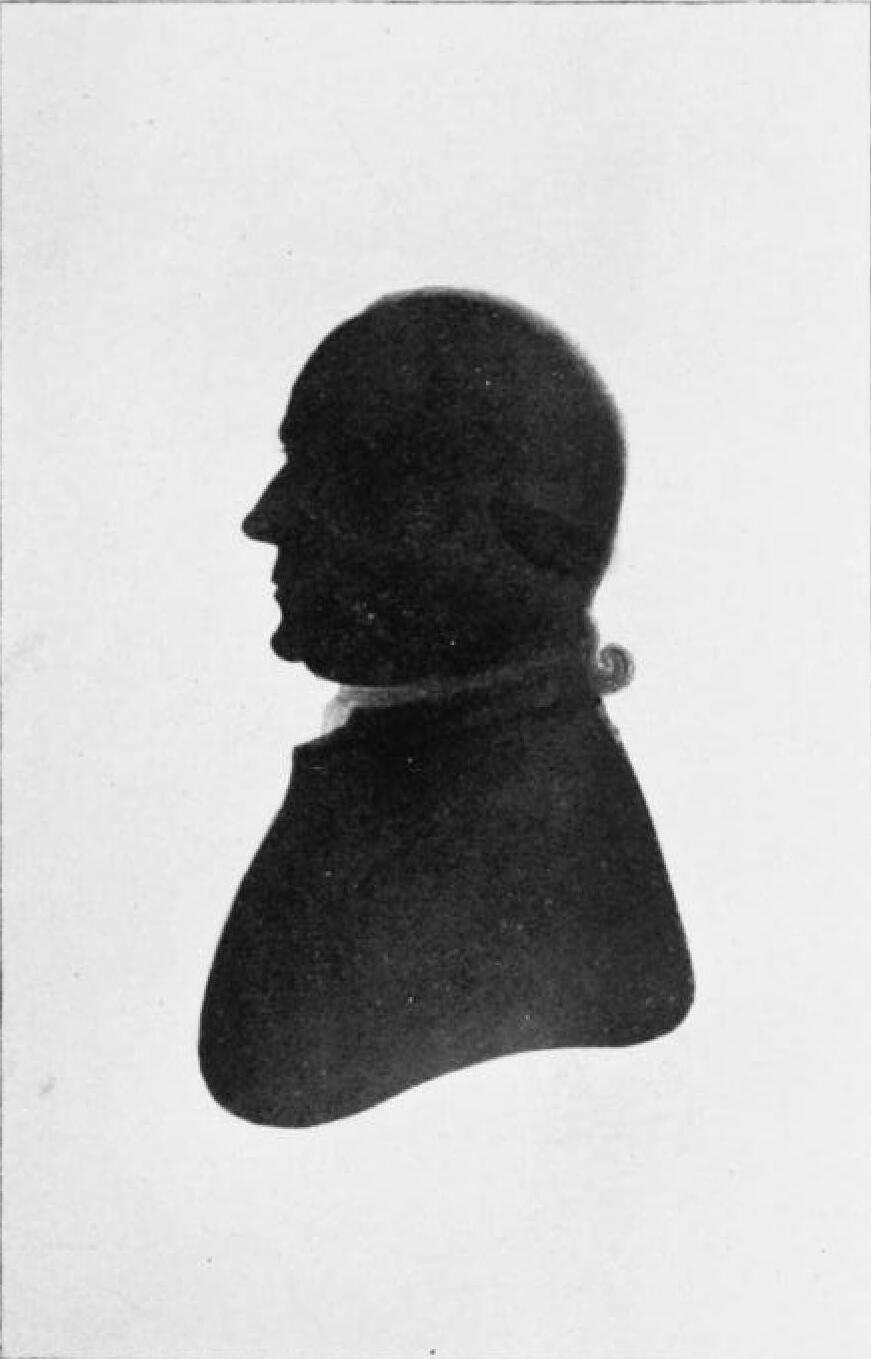
- Born: 1730
- Died: 1792 (aged 61–62)

James Bringhurst (December 7, 1730 – February 27, 1810) was an American builder and merchant.

== Biography ==
Bringhurst was born in Philadelphia on December 7, 1730, to prominent Quaker parents John Bringhurst and Mary Claypoole. During the early part of his career, he was a master carpenter and builder, and later was a successful merchant.

Bringhurst owned an estate in Grays Ferry inherited from his first wife's father, and was active in The Carpenters' Company of Philadelphia, Philadelphia Hospital, and the Pennsylvania Society for Promoting the Abolition of Slavery.

In 1774, Bringhurst was elected to membership in the American Philosophical Society. He was also a member of the building committee that oversaw the planning and construction of Philosophical Hall in Philadelphia. His son Joseph, a doctor, later joined the APS.

Bringhurst married three times. His first wife was Anna Pole, with whom he fathered Joseph Bringhurst Sr.; his second and third were, respectively, Hannah Peters and Ruth Barker.

== Later years and death ==
Bringhurst was a resident of Rhode Island at the time of his death.
