= Dawn chorus =

Dawn chorus may refer to:

- Dawn chorus (birds), when songbirds sing at the start of a new day
- Dawn chorus (electromagnetic), an electromagnetic wave phenomenon

== Music ==
- Dawn Chorus (album), by Jacques Greene, 2019
- "Dawn Chorus", a song by Boards of Canada from their album, Geogaddi
- "Dawn Chorus", a song by Modern English from their album After the Snow
- "Dawn Chorus", a song by Thom Yorke from his album Anima
- Dawn Chorus (Canon of the Three Stars), 1984 album by Isao Tomita
- Dawn Chorus, a 2017 album by Hidden Orchestra
- Dawn Chorus and the Blue Tits, a band featuring Liz Kershaw
