= Kourou (river) =

River in France

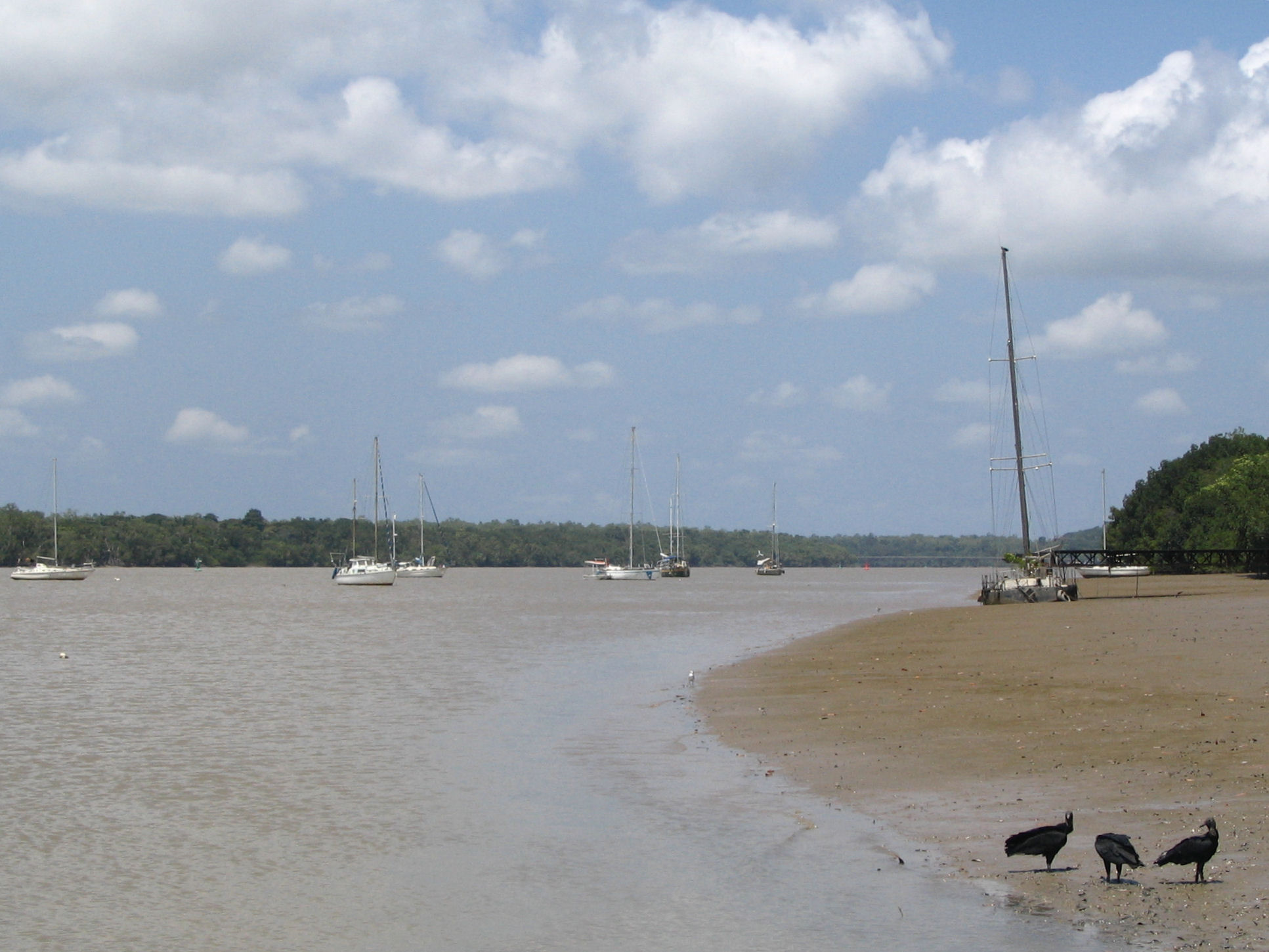
- American black vultures on the shore of the Kourou River

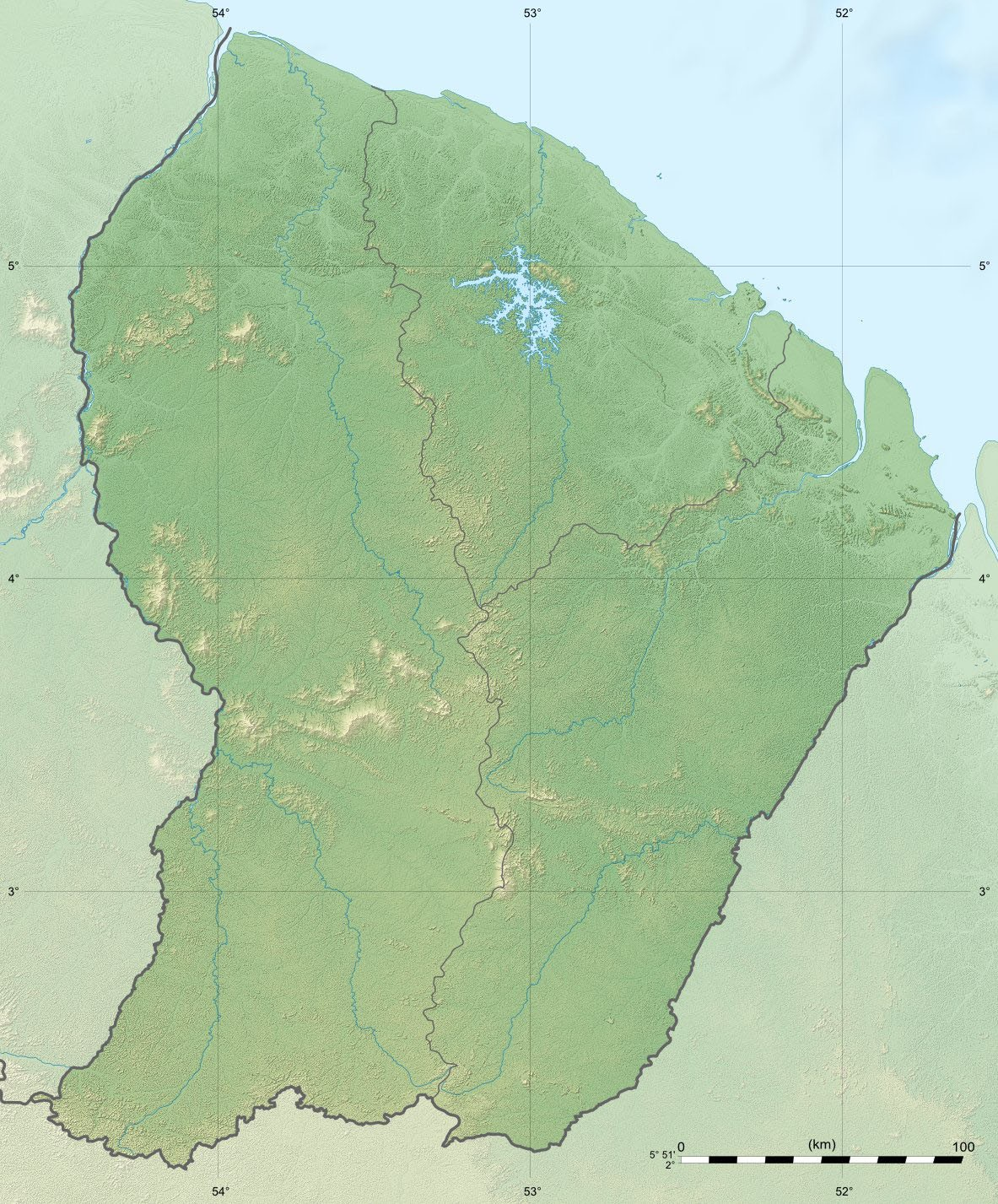

Location
- Country: French Guiana

Physical characteristics
- Source
  - location: Amazon rainforest
- Mouth: Atlantic Ocean
  - coordinates: 5°9′10″N 52°37′45″W
- Length: 144 km (89 mi)
- Basin size: 2,000 km^{2} (770 sq mi)
- Discharge
  - average: 3,000 m^{3}/s (110,000 cu ft/s)

The Kourou (French pronunciation: [kuru]) is a river in French Guiana, discharging into the Atlantic Ocean. It is 144 km (89 mi) long. The town of Kourou is located at its estuary, which is generally used as a pleasure port.

Like the river Amazon, it has brown, muddy waters due to sediments picked up from the forest. A great many different fish species live in the river and are used in the local diet.

Like many Guyanaise rivers, it is polluted by mercury, as a result of clandestine gold mining.
