= Choirboy (disambiguation) =

Choirboy is a boy member of a choir, also known as a treble

Choirboy and variants may also refer to:

- Choir Boy, a Broadway play
- Choir Boy (band), an alternative rock / dream-pop band from Salt Lake City
- The Choirboys (novel), a 1975 novel by Joseph Wambaugh
- The Choirboys (film), a 1977 film adaptation of the novel starring Perry King
- The Choirboys (band), an Australian hard rock band
    - Choirboys (album), debut album of the Australian band of the same name
- The Choirboys (group), a British boyband of cathedral choristers
- The Choirboys, the early name of British rock band The Quireboys
